= Midrash Eleh Ezkerah =

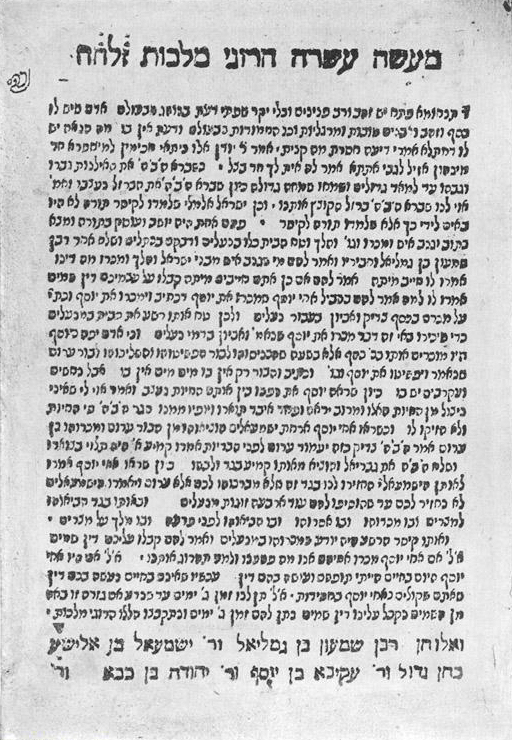
Page from Midrash Eleh Ezkerah, Constantinople (?), 1620.

Midrash Eleh Ezkerah (Hebrew: אֵלֶּה אֶזְכְּרָה ʾĒlle ʾEzkərā) is an aggadic midrash, one of the smaller midrashim, which receives its name from the fact that a seliḥah for the Day of Atonement, which treats the same subject and begins with the words "ʾĒlle ʾEzkərā," recounts the execution of ten famous teachers in the time of the persecution by Hadrian. The same event is related in a very ancient source, Lamentations Rabbah, and also in Midrash Tehillim from the fifth and sixth centuries of the common era.

== The version in Eleh Ezkerah ==
According to the Midrash Eleh Ezkerah, and a brief parallel source in Midrash Mishlei, a Roman emperor commanded the execution of the ten sages of Israel to expiate the guilt of the sons of Jacob, who had sold their brother Joseph—a crime which, according to Exodus 21:16, had to be punished with death.

The names of the martyrs are given here, as in the seliḥah (varying in part from Lamentations Rabbah and Midrash Tehillim), as follows:

1. Simeon ben Gamliel
2. Ishmael ben Elisha ha-Kohen
3. Rabbi Akiva
4. Haninah ben Teradion
5. Judah ben Bava
6. Judah ben Dama
7. Hutzpit the Interpreter
8. Hanina ben Hakinai
9. Jeshbab the Scribe
10. Eleazar ben Shammua

Although this midrash employs other sources, borrowing its introduction from the Midrash Konen, and the account of the conversation of Rabbi Ishmael with the angels in heaven probably from the Hekalot, it forms, nevertheless, a coherent work. Based on a Hamburg codex, it was edited by A. Jellinek and, according to another manuscript, by S. Chones, in his Rav Pe'alim. A second and a third recension of the midrash were edited, based on manuscript sources, in Jellinek's B. H., and a fourth is contained in the Spanish liturgical work Bet Av. According to Jellinek, "the fourth recension is the oldest, since it has borrowed large portions from the Hekalot; next to this stand the second and the third; while the youngest is the first, which, nevertheless, has the advantage of real conformity with the spirit of the race and represents this the best of all." The martyrdom of the ten sages is also treated in the additions to the Hekalot and in the qinna for Tisha B'Av.
