= Eliezer ben Jacob II =

Eliezer ben Jacob II (Hebrew: אליעזר בן יעקב) was a Tanna of the 2nd century.

== Biography ==
He is mentioned among Rabbi Akiva's younger disciples who survived the fall of Bethar and the subsequent Hadrianic persecutions, including Judah bar Ilai, Rabbi Meir, Shimon bar Yochai, Eliezer ben Jose. With most of them he maintained halakhic disputations. He was the founder of a school known in the Talmud after his name, "Debei R. Eliezer b. Jacob", which sometimes opposed the "Debe R. Ishmael".

== Teachings ==
Like his older namesake, Eliezer ben Jacob I, Eliezer II is quoted in both halakhah and aggadah.

From Deuteronomy 22:5 he concludes that a woman must never handle arms or go to war, and that man must not use ornaments which women usually wear.

It is related of him that he once gave up the seat of honor to a poor blind man. The distinction thus conferred on the visitor by so eminent a man induced the people thereafter bounteously to provide for the needy one, who, when he realized the cause of his good fortune, thanked its author. He said, "Thou hast shown kindness unto one who is seen, but cannot see: may He who sees, but cannot be seen, harken to thy prayers and show thee kindness".

=== Quotes ===
- One who performs a pious deed gains for himself an advocate [before heaven], and one who commits a sin creates an accuser against himself. Penitence and pious deeds constitute a shield against heavenly visitations".
