= Hekhalot literature =

Visions of ascents into heavenly palaces

Hekhalot literature (sometimes transliterated as Heichalot), from the Hebrew word for "Palaces," relates to visions of entering heaven alive. The genre overlaps with Merkabah mysticism, also called "Chariot literature", which concerns Ezekiel's vision of the throne-chariot, so the two are sometimes referred to as the "Books of the Palaces and the Chariot" (Hebrew: ספרות ההיכלות והמרכבה). Hekhalot literature is a genre of Jewish esoteric and revelatory texts produced sometime between late antiquity (some believe from Talmudic times or earlier) to the Early Middle Ages.

Many motifs of later Kabbalah are based on the Hekhalot texts, and Hekhalot literature itself is based upon earlier sources, including traditions about the heavenly ascents of Enoch found among the Dead Sea Scrolls and the Pseudepigrapha. Hekhalot itself has many pseudepigraphic texts.

== Texts ==
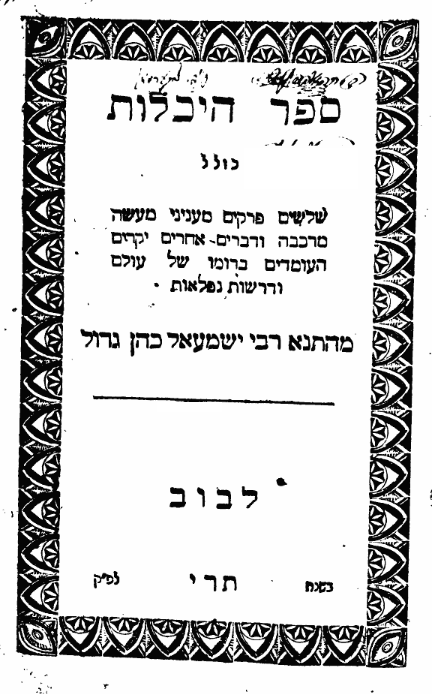
Title Page of Hekhalot, Lvov, Poland, 1850

Some of the Hekhalot texts are:

- Hekhalot Zutartey "Lesser Palaces" or "Palaces Minor," which details an ascent of Rabbi Akiva through the seven heavens, seeking revelations regarding the holy name of God
- Hekhalot Rabbati "Greater Palaces" or "Palaces Major," which details the ascent of Rabbi Ishmael when he sought to examine the validity of the decree regarding the execution of the Ten Martyrs
- Maaseh Merkabah "Account of the Chariot," a collection of hymns recited by the "descenders" into the holy chariot, and heard during their ascent
- Merkavah Rabba "Greater Chariot"
- 3 Enoch or "Book of Palaces"

Other similar texts are:

- Re'uyyot Yehezqel "The Visions of Ezekiel"
- Massekhet Hekhalot "The Tractate of the Palaces"
- Shi'ur Qomah "Divine Dimensions"
- Sefer HaRazim "Book of the Mysteries"
- The Sword of Moses
- Alphabet of Rabbi Akiva

The Hekhalot texts frequently give the Kedushah prayer a place of prominence and feature hymns based on it. These hymns may have been used to induce trance in mystics. Time as it appears in these hymns is not calendrical, and instead emphasizes a present, simultaneous, and ongoing "sacred time".

== Dating and genre ==
Hekhalot literature is post-rabbinical, and not a literature of the rabbis, but since it seeks to stand in continuity with the Rabbinic literature, it is often pseudepigraphical. Some scholars think the Hekhalot literature was composed in Palestine, and Michael Swartz believes that the ideas in Hekhalot literature were common knowledge among many Jews during the early period of classical piyyut (5th-7th century).

Hekhalot has examples of early alternate history texts.

Hekhalot is sometimes thought to be connected to the merkaba mystics. James Davila believes that the merkaba mystics and their ritual texts were practical applications of ideas found in Hekhalot literature, and that these mystics would have been a kind of shaman.

== See also ==
- Primary texts of Kabbalah
- Smaller midrashim
- Mystical ascent in the Midrash Eleh Ezkerah
- Ten Martyrs
