= Hutzpit the Interpreter =

Hutzpit the Interpreter (Hebrew: חָצְפִּית הַמְּתוּרְגְּמָן, romanized: Ḥoṣpīṯ hamMəṯūrgəmān) was a rabbi of the third generation of tannaim.

== Biography ==
According to Berachot 27b, his title comes from his position as the interpreter of Gamaliel II, the head of the Sanhedrin: Gamaliel would speak softly, and Hutzpit would announce Gamaliel's words to the listeners. The Tosefta in Keilim Batra 2:1 says that one point, he lived in Sepphoris and had contact with rabbis Eleazar ben Azariah, Jeshbab the Scribe, Halafta, and Johanan ben Nuri.

He is described as one of the Ten Martyrs in the Midrash Eleh Ezkerah, where he is said to have been murdered and dismembered "one day short of his 130th birthday". According to a story in Kiddushin 39b, Elisha ben Abuyah lost his faith after seeing Hutzpit's detached tongue lying in the dust after the murder.
