= Haninah ben Teradion =

2nd century Jewish rabbi and teacher

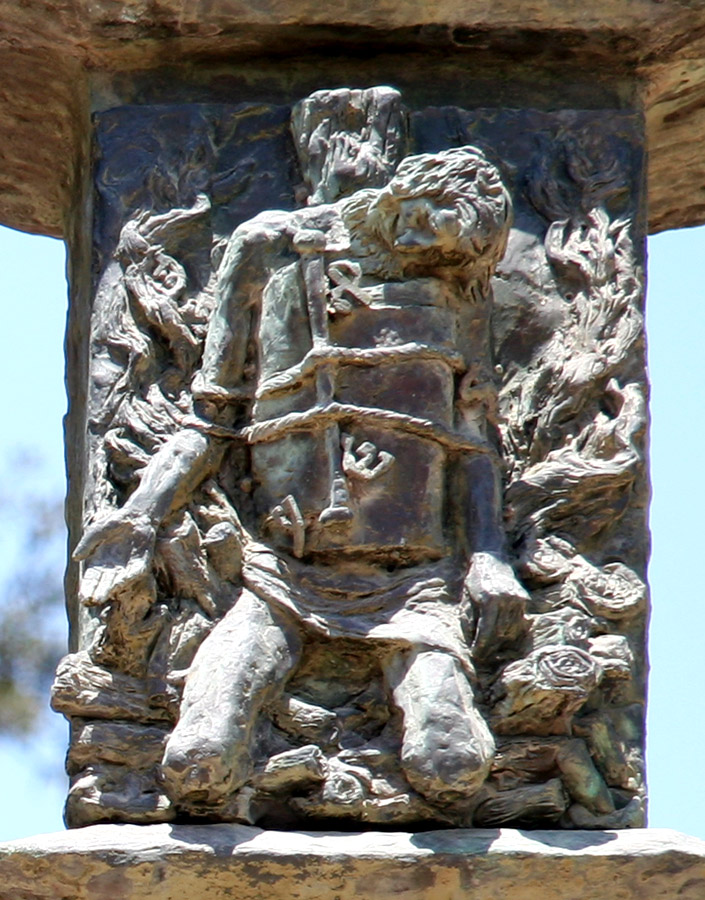
Haninah's martyrdom on the Knesset Menorah

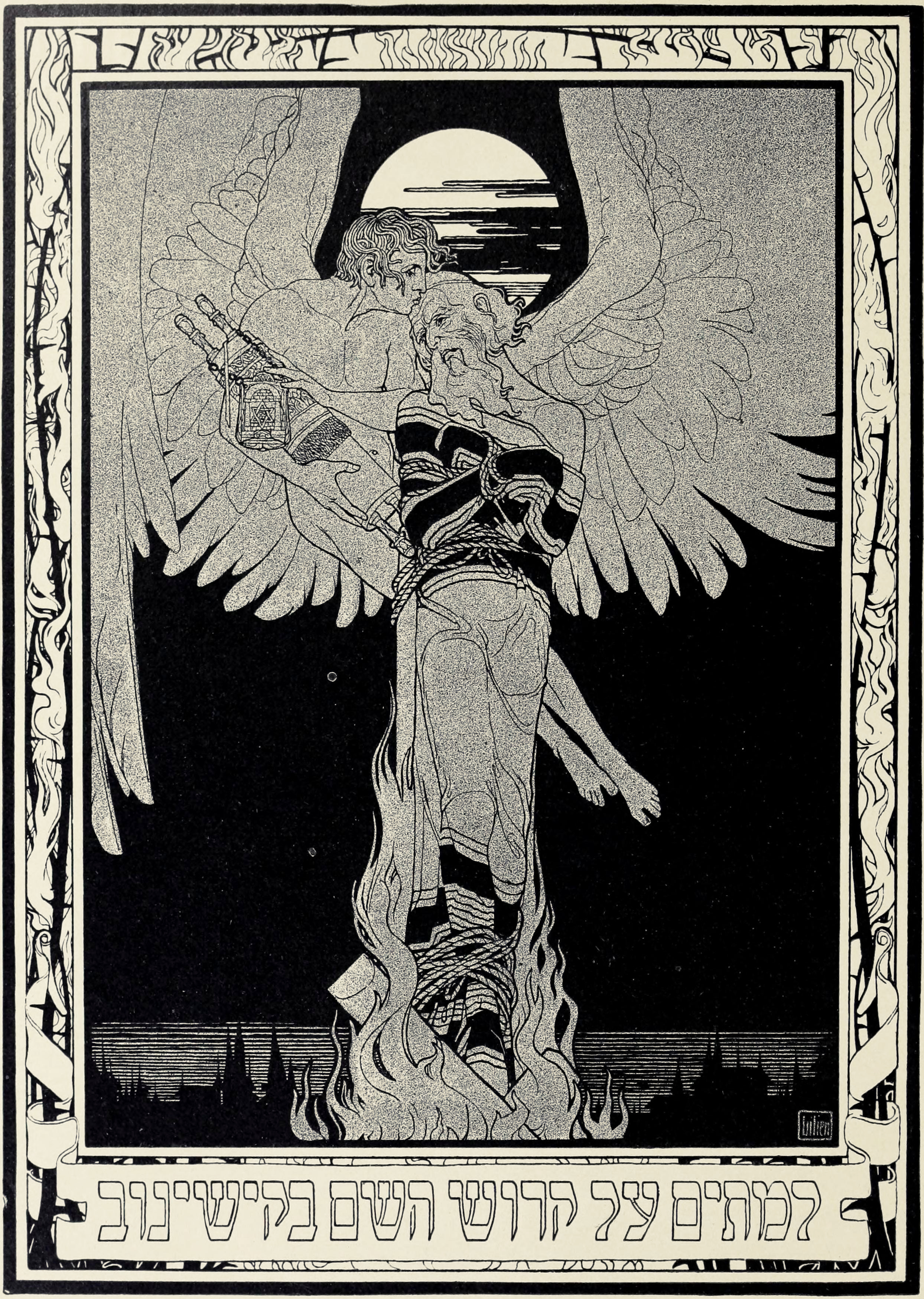
Imprint by Ephraim Moses Lilien depicting Haninah's martyrdom, dedicated to those who died during the Kishinev pogrom of 1903.

Haninah ben Teradion (Hebrew: חֲנִינָא בֶּן תְּרַדְיוֹן, romanized: Ḥanīnā ben Təraḏyon) or Hananiah (חֲנַנְיָה Ḥananyā) was a rabbi and tanna of the third generation (2nd century). He was a contemporary of Eleazar ben Perata I and of Halafta, together with whom he established certain ritual rules. Known as one of the wealthiest men in Galilee, he also served as the treasurer of a fund for the poor. Following the Bar Kokhba revolt, he was executed by the Romans for ignoring the ban on teaching Torah, and is considered one of the Ten Martyrs.

== Life and work ==
His residence was at Sikhnin, where he directed religious affairs as well as a school. The latter came to be numbered among the distinguished academies with reference to which a baraitha says: "The saying 'That which is altogether just shall you follow' may be construed, 'Follow the sages in their respective academies. ... Follow Rabbi Haninah ben Teradion in Sikhnin'".

Haninah administered the communal charity funds, and so scrupulous was he in that office that once when money of his own, designed for personal use on Purim, chanced to get mixed with the charity funds, he distributed the whole amount among the poor. Eleazar ben Jacob II so admired Haninah's honesty that he remarked, "No one ought to contribute to the charity treasury unless its administrator is like Haninah ben Teradion".

Comparatively few halakhot are preserved from him. One of Haninah's most respected proofs regarded that the Shekhinah rests on those who study the Law.

== Martyrdom ==
During the Hadrianic persecutions decrees were promulgated imposing the most rigorous penalties on the observers of the Jewish law, and especially upon those who occupied themselves with the promulgation of that law. Nevertheless, Hananiah conscientiously followed his chosen profession; he convened public assemblies and taught Torah.

For this he and his wife were condemned to death, and their daughter to degradation (forced prostitution). He was wrapped in a Torah scroll and set ablaze on a bed of grass. Wet wool was placed on his chest to prolong his suffering. His disciples begged him to open his mouth so that the fire could "enter" and kill him faster, but Haninah refused. Thereupon the executioner removed the wool and fanned the flame, thus accelerating the end. Immediately afterwards, he jumped into the flame and committed suicide. It is said that as Rabbi Hananiah was burned, he claimed to see the letters on the scroll flying up to heaven.

== Notable family members ==
Of the surviving members of Haninah's family mentioned are two daughters: Bruriah, who became the wife of Rabbi Meir; and one who was held in a brothel, whom Rabbi Meir succeeded in rescuing.

Haninah had also several sons, one of whom was rather learned. It is related that Simon ben Haninah applied to this son for information on a point of discussion, and that the latter and his sister, presumably Bruriah, furnished divergent opinions. When Judah ben Baba heard of those opinions, he remarked, "Haninah's daughter teaches better than his son."

Elsewhere it is reported of a son that became a degenerate, associating with a band of listim, i.e. bandits. Subsequently, he apparently betrayed his criminal associates, who retaliated by killing him and filling his mouth with sand and gravel. Having discovered his remains, the people wished to eulogize him as a community out of respect for his father, but the latter would not permit it.
