= Ten Martyrs =

Ten rabbis killed after the destruction of the Temple

The Ten Royal Martyrs (Hebrew: עֲשֶׂרֶת הָרוּגֵי מַלְכוּת ʿĂsereṯ Hārūgē Malḵūṯ) were ten rabbis living during the era of the Mishnah who were martyred by the Roman Empire in the period after the destruction of the Second Temple. Their story is detailed in Midrash Eleh Ezkerah.

Although not killed at the same time (since two of the rabbis listed lived well before the other eight), a dramatic poem (known as Eleh Ezkera) tells their story as if they were killed together. This poem is recited in the Eastern Ashkenazic rite in Musaf on Yom Kippur (and at other times in the various Western Ashkenazic rites). A different poem about the Ten Martyrs is recited on Tisha B'Av, and still a third poem is recited in Western Ashkenazic rites on other occasions.

== Story as told in the poem Eleh Ezkerah ==
In the poem, the Roman emperor Hadrian decides to martyr ten rabbis as 'punishment' for the ten brothers listed in the Torah who sold their brother Joseph to Ancient Egypt. He rationalizes this by saying that the penalty for this was death. Though this crime took place almost 2000 years earlier, and Jewish law does not allow for the descendants of sinners to be punished, the Roman commander goes ahead with the executions because (he says) there are 'none like you' ten who are capable of rectifying this crime.

The poem lists the first two to be executed: Rabban Shimon ben Gamliel and Rabbi Yishmael ben Elisha ha-Kohen Gadol. Rabban Shimon ben Gamliel was beheaded, and while Rabbi Yishmael grieved, weeping over his severed head, the Roman ruler's daughter coveted Rabbi Yishmael for his physical beauty. When she was told that he would have to be executed as well, she asked that the skin of his head be flayed while he was alive, so she could stuff the skin and look at his face. When the servants began to strip away the skin on the forehead where the phylactery is placed, Yishmael cried aloud and died. Next to die was Rabbi Akiva, whose skin was raked with iron combs. Despite the pain consuming him, he was still able to proclaim God's providence in the world by reciting the Shema, drawing out the final Echad - "One". The next sage martyred was Rabbi Haninah ben Teradion, who was wrapped in a Torah scroll and burned alive. Wet sponges of wool were placed on his chest to ensure he would not die quickly. When he was being burnt, he told his students that he could see the letters of the sacred Torah "flying up" to heaven.

In the poem, the remaining martyrs listed are Hutzpit the Interpreter, Elazar ben Shamua, Hanina ben Hakinai, Yesheivav the Scribe, Judah ben Dama and Judah ben Baba, in that order. In Midrash Eleh Ezkerah, the order is somewhat different.

=== Listed Martyrs ===
1. Rabban Shimon ben Gamliel
2. Rabbi Ishmael ben Elisha ha-Kohen
3. Rabbi Akiva
4. Rabbi Haninah ben Teradion
5. Rabbi Hutzpit the Interpreter
6. Rabbi Elazar ben Shamua
7. Rabbi Hanina ben Hakinai
8. Rabbi Yesheivav the Scribe
9. Rabbi Judah ben Dama
10. Rabbi Judah ben Baba

== Historical evaluation ==
Popular imagination seized upon this episode in Jewish history, and embellished it with various stories relating the virtues of the martyrs and the fortitude shown by them during their execution. These legends became in the Geonic period the subject of a special midrash—the Midrash Asarah Harugei Malkut, or Midrash Eleh Ezkerah. The deaths are described therein as being gruesome.

Contrary to the accounts given in the Talmud, Midrash Rabbah, and Midrash Eleh Ezkerah, which clearly state that there were intervals between the executions of the ten teachers, the poem Eleh Ezkerah describes their martyrdom as occurring on the same day, probably in order to produce a greater effect upon the mind of the reader.

To this end, while certain accounts of the Ten Martyrs' deaths from these sources are more fragmented than others, they seem to preserve a more historically accurate account of the deaths themselves:

- The Avot of Rabbi Natan states that Shimon ben Gamliel and Ishmael ben Elisha ha-Kohen were executed while in Roman captivity, having drawn lots to determine who would be first to die. When the lots fell on Shimon, he was swiftly decapitated, and as Ishmael grieved over his friend's death, he was quickly decapitated as well.
- The deaths of Rabbi Akiva and Haninah ben Teradion are consistent over practically every source, including the embellished accounts in Eleh Ezkerah.
- All that can be gleaned of the execution of Hutzpit the Interpreter from historical sources is that he was dismembered either during or after his execution, as several sages apparently opined that the sight of Hutzpit's detached tongue lying in the dirt was one of the reasons for Elisha ben Abuyah's apostasy.
- Likewise, it appears that neither Hanina ben Hakinai or Yesheivav the Scribe were counted among the Ten Martyrs until several centuries after their deaths, as no contemporary work dealing with the martyrdoms mention them.
- The name "Judah ben Dama" does not appear in history before the Eleh Ezkerah. Bahya ben Asher wrote that one Eleazar ben Dama was apparently ordered to be executed by the same decree which sentenced Shimon ben Gamliel, Ishmael ben Elisha ha-Kohen, and Judah ben Baba to death. However, even this seems to be inaccurate, as Eleazar's death is attributed to a venomous snake bite in an infamous narrative associated with Jacob the Heretic, and (among other things) Bahya attributes this decree to the "Caesar Lupinos", a Roman emperor who doesn't appear to have ever existed.
- Judah ben Baba, despite being listed among the Ten Martyrs, does not appear to have been executed by order of the emperor himself, though he was, in essence, martyred nonetheless. As opposed to an execution, the Talmud relates that Judah was caught in the act of ordaining his students by Roman soldiers, and himself being an old man, commanded his students to flee and leave him behind, at which point the soldiers killed him using their javelins.

Ultimately, despite contemporary sources maintaining that ten great scholars had been martyred by the Romans, only six of the traditional martyrs seem to have been genuinely martyred.

The identities of some of the lesser known martyrs are also inconsistently reported. In some sources, Jose ben Halafta, Rabbi Tarfon, or Elazar ben Ḥarsum are listed in place of Elazar ben Shamua, Simeon ben Azzai is listed in place of Hanina ben Hakinai, and Judah the Baker or Hanina Segan ha-Kohanim are listed in place of Judah ben Dama.

== Use in ritual ==
The poem Eleh Ezkerah is best known as part of the Yom Kippur mussaf recital in the Eastern Ashkenazic rite. This is done in remembrance of the impact of losing so many pillars of Judaism for the masses at that time. As such, it has become one of the 'highlights' of the day, marking a point when the congregation should reflect on their own lives and the sacrifices that were made for their sake.

A similar poem, Arzei haLevanon, is recited in the Eastern Ashkenazic rite (kinot #21) as one of the Kinot on Tisha B'Av; it was adopted in some Western Ashkenazic communities, but it is not really part of that rite. The Tisha B'av text is shorter and contains differences from Yom Kippur's Eleh Ezkerah:

- places Judah ben Baba and Yesheivav the Scribe in a different order
- says that there are ten marytrs, but omits Judah ben Dama. Rabbi Yishmael is not named directly, but is identified as the descendant of Aharon.
- and adds that
  - the body of Yesheivav the Scribe was fed to dogs; he "was not buried in a proper grave."
  - Elazar ben Shamua was killed while, on a Friday night, he was saying Kiddush.

== See also ==
- Judea (Roman province)
- Midrash Eleh Ezkera

== External sources ==
- Text of Eleh Ezkerah poem
- Overview of The Ten Martyrs
- Overview of The Ten Martyrs from Jewish Encyclopedia
- Arzei Levanon
