= Eleazar Chisma =

Eleazar Chisma (Ḥisma; Hebrew: אלעזר חסמא, "Eleazar Chasma", or אלעזר בן חסמא, "Eleazar ben Chasma") was a tanna (sage) of the second and third generations (2nd century). He was a disciple of Joshua ben Hananiah and Gamaliel II.

== Etymology ==
He is sometimes referred to as "Eleazar Chisma" and sometimes as "Eleazar ben Chisma"; however, the insertion of the word "ben" seems justifiable. "Ḥisma" is not an adjectival cognomen (like the similar nickname acquired by Eleazar ben Shammua), but an indication of location, the place probably being Hizma; hence "ben Ḥisma" means "son of [= "native of"] Ḥisma".

== Teachings ==
Several halakhot are preserved under Eleazar's name in the Mishnah. He takes part in halakhic disputes with Eleazar ben Azariah and Rabbi Akiva and with Eliezer ben Jacob I. To him is ascribed the economic rule that the employee is not entitled to a proportion of his employer's produce greater than the amount of his wages.

Some aggadot also are ascribed to him. Together with Rabbi Joshua, he gives an allegorical reason for why Amalek's attack on Israel occurred when it did. Citing Job 8:11, "Can a rush grow up without mire? Can the flag grow without water?" he remarks, "Even so is it impossible for Israel to flourish without the Law; and since they had neglected the Law, an enemy was ordered out to war against them." Elsewhere, he cites Isaiah 43:22, "But thou hast not called on me, O Jacob," and applies it to those who are not devout in their prayers, but communicate with their neighbors by sign language while reciting the Shema.

== Scientific knowledge ==
Not only was Chizma possessed of wide rabbinic learning, but he was also an adept in the sciences. Joshua, introducing him and Johanan ben Nuri to the notice of Patriarch Gamaliel II, remarked of them that they could approximately calculate the number of drops contained in the ocean. As they were very poor, Gamaliel appointed them to remunerative offices in the academy. Probably it was here—because the academicians sought from him instruction in secular science—that Eleazar remarked, "The laws concerning birds' nests and those concerning the incipient uncleanness of women are elements of the Law, while astronomy and geometry are only condiments of wisdom".
