= Hanina (disambiguation) =

Hanina was a second and third generation Amora Sage of the Land of Israel.

Hanina may also refer to:

- Hananiah, a given name
- "Hanina", a song by Mohamed Mounir from his 2003 album Ahmar Shafayef
- Hanina Segan ha-Kohanim, a first generation Jewish Tanna sage
