= Yadua the Babylonian =

2nd-century Tanna

Yadua the Babylonian (Hebrew: ידוע הבבלי, translit: Yadua HaBavli) was a 2nd-century tanna of the fifth generation. He was born in Babylonia but subsequently moved to the Land of Israel, becoming the student of Rabbi Meir.

He is mentioned once in the Mishna:

- Yadua the Babylonian said in the name of Rabbi Meir: "If [two dogs came] from one direction they do not count as an unavoidable accident, but if [they came] from two directions they count as an unavoidable accident."
