= Simeon the Yemenite =

Rabbinic sage of Judaea

Simeon the Yemenite (Hebrew: שמעון התֵּימָנִי, translit: Shimon HaTeimani) or the variant Simeon of Timnah (Hebrew: שמעון התִּימְנִי, romanized: Shimon HaTimni) (fl. c. 80 - 120 CE) was a third-generation Tanna of possible Yemenite origin who was active in Judaea.

== Life ==
He was one of the three Simeons who were considered among the great "students" of the generation before the Bar Kokhba Revolt, the other two being Ben Azzai and Ben Zoma. His teachers were Rabbi Joshua ben Hananiah, Rabbi Akiva and Rabbi Tarfon. He had a daily study session with Judah ben Baba. His teachings recorded in the Mishnah and Baraitot generally refer to matters of Halakhah, only a few being of an Aggadic nature. Renowned for his ability to solve complex issues, he was one of the most important sages of the Sanhedrin in Jabneh and was among the few who were proficient in seventy languages. He reportedly died at a young age before gaining ordination and is therefore never referred to as "Rabbi".

He is noted for saying: "A bastard is anyone who is born from an [illegal] union for which his parents are liable to kareth", and which teaching comes to exclude a single parent who gave birth to a child outside of wedlock, and whose child is often wrongly called "bastard" under common law.

== Origin ==
There is a dispute regarding Rabbi Simeon's origin, whether he was from Yemen or from the Judean town of Timnah. This is due to a variant reading of the Hebrew word "תימני" which can either be pronounced as "Teimani" or "Timni". A reference in tractate Ketubot is identified by Adin Steinsaltz as being "Shimon HaTimni", named so after his native town of Timnah. This is a position taken by earlier commentators, such as Rashi (Ta'anit 19a), Bartenura (Mishnah Ta'anit 3, 7) and Machzor Vitri. Steinsaltz suggest's he was active in his hometown, though he seems to have spent much of his time in the academy at Jabneh. Other commentators believe this tanna was from Yemen, a view taken by Jacob Emden. One attempt to reconcile the issue based on a list of tannaim prepared by Maimonides suggests that there were in fact two rabbis, one from Yemen and one from Timnah. Another view suggests that he was from Teman, an important city of ancient Edom, a view ratified by the Jewish Encyclopedia which calls him "Simeon of Teman".

== Selection of teachings ==
- Simeon the Yemenite said: It was due to the observance of circumcision that God divided the Sea for them.
- Simeon the Yemenite said: They also sound the horn in the case of pestilence, but the Sages did not agree with him.
