= Rachel, wife of Rabbi Akiva =

- Unknown
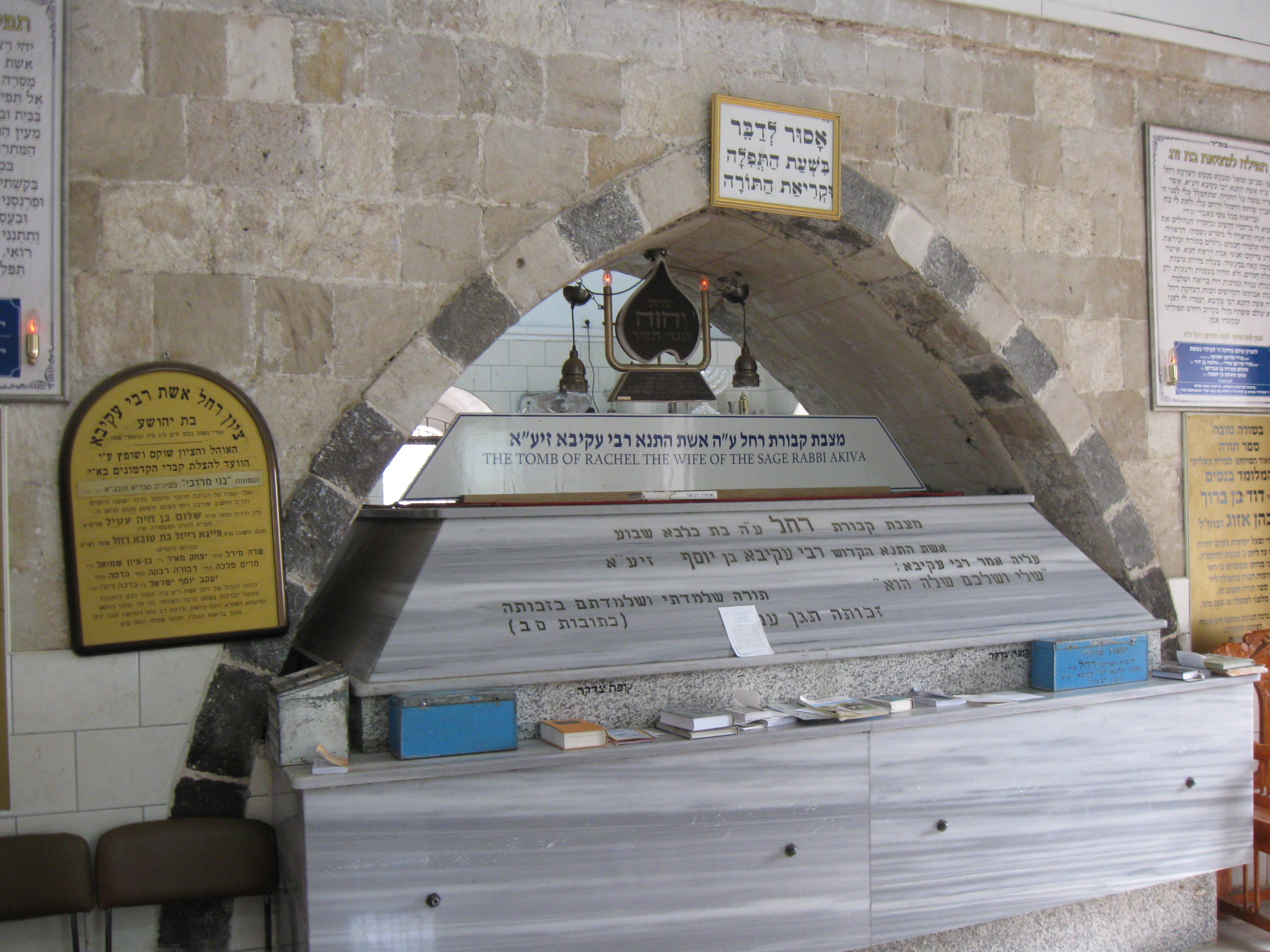
- The tomb of Rabbi Akiva's wife, in Tiberias
- Burial place: Tiberias, Israel
- Era: 1st century CE
- Spouse: Rabbi Akiva
- Children: 3
- Father: Joshua "ben Kalba Savu'a"

The wife of Rabbi Akiva (Hebrew: אשת רבי עקיבא) was a late 1st-century CE Jewish resident of Judea who is cited by the Talmud and Aggadah as a paragon of the Jewish wife who encourages her husband to pursue Torah study and is willing to make personal sacrifices to achieve that goal. She was the wife of the Tanna Rabbi Akiva, who became one of the greatest Torah scholars in Jewish history. She played a significant role in encouraging Akiva to pursue Torah study, as he was uneducated when they married. Her father, the wealthy ben Kalba Savu'a, disowned her over her choice of husband, and the couple lived in dire poverty. With her blessing, Akiva left to study in a Torah academy for 24 years. He returned home a renowned scholar accompanied by 24,000 disciples. When she came out in ragged clothing to greet him, his disciples tried to push her aside. Akiva told them, "Leave her. What is mine and what is yours is hers". Upon seeing his son-in-law's Torah scholarship, ben Kalba Savu'a reconciled with him and gave him half his wealth. Later Akiva had a special golden diadem fashioned for his wife, depicting the city of Jerusalem (named a Jerusalem of Gold).

The name of Akiva's wife is not known, as it was never recorded wherever she is mentioned in the Talmud. Various names have been attributed to her throughout the years, today she is most popularly known as Rachel, following the medieval Avot of Rabbi Natan. The tomb of Rachel in Tiberias is a pilgrimage site for men and women.

== Background ==
In rabbinic literature, women are exempt from Torah study. The Talmud states that women gain the merit of Torah study by encouraging their husbands and sons to go learn:

Rav said to Rabbi Hiyyah: Whereby do women gain this merit [of Torah study]? By taking their sons go to the synagogue to learn and waiting for their husbands to return from the beit midrash where they had been studying Torah (Berakhot 17a).

Rachel is considered a prime example of a wife who encourages her husband to pursue Torah study and is willing to make personal sacrifices to achieve that goal.

== Sources ==
The story of Rachel's marriage to Akiva and their subsequent lives appears in three classical sources. They are:

- Babylonian Talmud, Ketubot 62b-63a; Nedarim 50a
- Jerusalem Talmud, Shabbat 6:1, 7d; Sotah 9:15, 24c
- Avot of Rabbi Natan, Version A, chapter 6; Version B, chapter 12

== Name ==
Rachel's name does not appear in the Talmud, which refers to her as the daughter of ben (the son of) Kalba Savu'a. Her name is found in the aggadic work Avot of Rabbi Natan. Ilan postulates that the latter work may have derived her name from two Talmudic proverbs printed at the end of the story of Rachel and Akiva in Ketubot 63a. Following the story, the Talmud states: "Akiva's daughter did similarly with Ben Azzai". This refers to a daughter of Akiva and Rachel who was married to the Tanna Ben Azzai. The Talmud then records these proverbs:

רחילא בתר רחילא אזלא – A sheep follows a sheep.
כעובדי אמה כך עובדי ברתא – The daughter did like her mother.

The Aramaic word for "sheep" is rachel, which may be hinting at both the mother's and daughter's names.

Boyarin has proposed that Rachel is the logical name for Akiva's wife, as she said before she went out to greet him after his 24-year absence, "The righteous man knows the soul of his animal". Akiva was a "shepherd" and Rachel was his "sheep".

== Early life and marriage ==
Rachel was the daughter of ben Kalba Savu'a, one of the three richest men living in Jerusalem prior to the destruction of the Second Temple. kalba savu'a literally means "satiated dog"; it was a tribute to his generosity, for anyone who came to his doorstep as hungry as a dog left with a full belly. His only child, Rachel, was a modest, accomplished young woman who could have had her pick of any young, wealthy Torah scholar. However, she set her eye on Akiva, one of her father's shepherds, who was uneducated. Perceiving his modesty and fine character traits, she asked him if he would agree to engage in Torah study if she married him. He agreed, and they were secretly betrothed. According to the narrative in Nedarim 50a, they married in secret.

According to Avot of Rabbi Natan, Rachel was Akiva's second wife. His first wife had died, leaving a son who accompanied him when he first began learning to read.

When Rachel's father found out that she was engaged to an uneducated man, he was furious. He threw her out of his house and swore she would not receive anything from him.

Rachel and Akiva married in the wintertime and lived in dire poverty. They made their home in a barn and slept on straw; Akiva picked the straw out of his wife's hair. Akiva promised his wife, "If I would have the means, I would make for you a 'Jerusalem of Gold' [a golden hair ornament depicting the city of Jerusalem]". The Talmud goes on to state that Elijah the prophet appeared at their door in the form of a pauper and begged them for some straw to make his wife comfortable after giving birth. When Akiva and his wife saw that there were people even poorer than they, Rachel said to him, "Go, and become a scholar".

=== Midrash HaGadol ===
The Midrash HaGadol relates a story showing how Rachel built up her husband's courage to go study Torah, as he was still illiterate at the age of 40 and was laughed at by the small children in the cheder when he arrived to start learning the aleph-bet. Rachel took the unusual step of putting dirt (or pots of dirt) on the back of their donkey, seeding it, and watering it daily. When the seeds sprouted and grew into plants, she asked Akiva to take the donkey to the marketplace so he could haul back some flour. In the marketplace, everyone pointed at the ridiculous garden growing on the donkey's back and laughed and jeered at Akiva. Akiva returned home utterly humiliated. The next day Rachel asked him to take the donkey to the marketplace to buy lentils, and the scene repeated itself. Every day Rachel came up with a new request to shop at the marketplace, and every day Akiva was the object of laughter and scoffing, although the abuse did lessen with time. When winter set in, people were so used to seeing Akiva and his donkey that they didn't give them a second thought. Akiva got the hint, and returned to the cheder. "That's good", Rachel said. "If you are embarrassed, you will never learn".

== Twenty-four-year separation ==
After receiving a basic education, Akiva left their home to study Torah at an academy under Rabbi Eliezer and Rabbi Yehoshua. Rachel moved in with Akiva's mother and worked to support herself and her husband; she sent half her wages to Akiva. When she found out that he could not afford oil for his lamp to study at night, she sold her hair in the marketplace. Twelve years later Akiva returned from the academy, accompanied by 12,000 disciples. As he entered their town, he overheard an old man chiding his wife, "How long will you be like a widow (waiting for him)?" and her response: "If he would listen to me, he would spend [in Torah study] another twelve years". Akiva took this as her assent for him to continue learning and, without greeting his wife, returned to the academy for another 12 years.

Twenty-four years later Akiva returned home, accompanied by 24,000 disciples. Rachel's neighbors told her to put on nice clothing to greet him, but she went out in her ragged clothes and fell at his feet. Akiva's disciples were appalled and wanted to push her aside, but Akiva said, "Leave her. What is mine and what is yours is hers". Meaning: "My Torah and your Torah came to us only in her merit".

Hearing that a great man had come to town, ben Kalba Savu'a also came out to meet him, hoping he would help him annul his vow to disown his daughter and her husband. Akiva asked him, "Would you have made your vow if you had known that he would become a great scholar?" ben Kalba Savu'a replied, "Had I known that he would learn even one chapter or one single halakha, [I would not have made the vow]". Akiva said to him, "I am that man". ben Kalba Savu'a fell at Akiva's feet and gave him half his wealth.

The Talmud states that Akiva became fabulously wealthy from his father-in-law and from five other sources. He fulfilled the promise he had made to Rachel when they were poor and had a special diadem made for her called a "Jerusalem of Gold" which depicted the city of Jerusalem. According to the Jerusalem Talmud, the wife of Rabban Gamliel was jealous of Rachel's diadem and complained to her husband. He responded, "Would you have done for me what Rabbi Akiva's wife did for him? Rabbi Akiva's wife sold the braids of her hair so that he could study Torah, and she earned that ornament".

== Children ==
Rachel and Akiva had one daughter and two sons. Their daughter was married to Ben Azzai, a 2nd-century Tanna.

The Talmud (Moed Katan 21B) tells a story of Rabbi Akiva's two sons who died on the same day.

== Tomb of Rachel ==
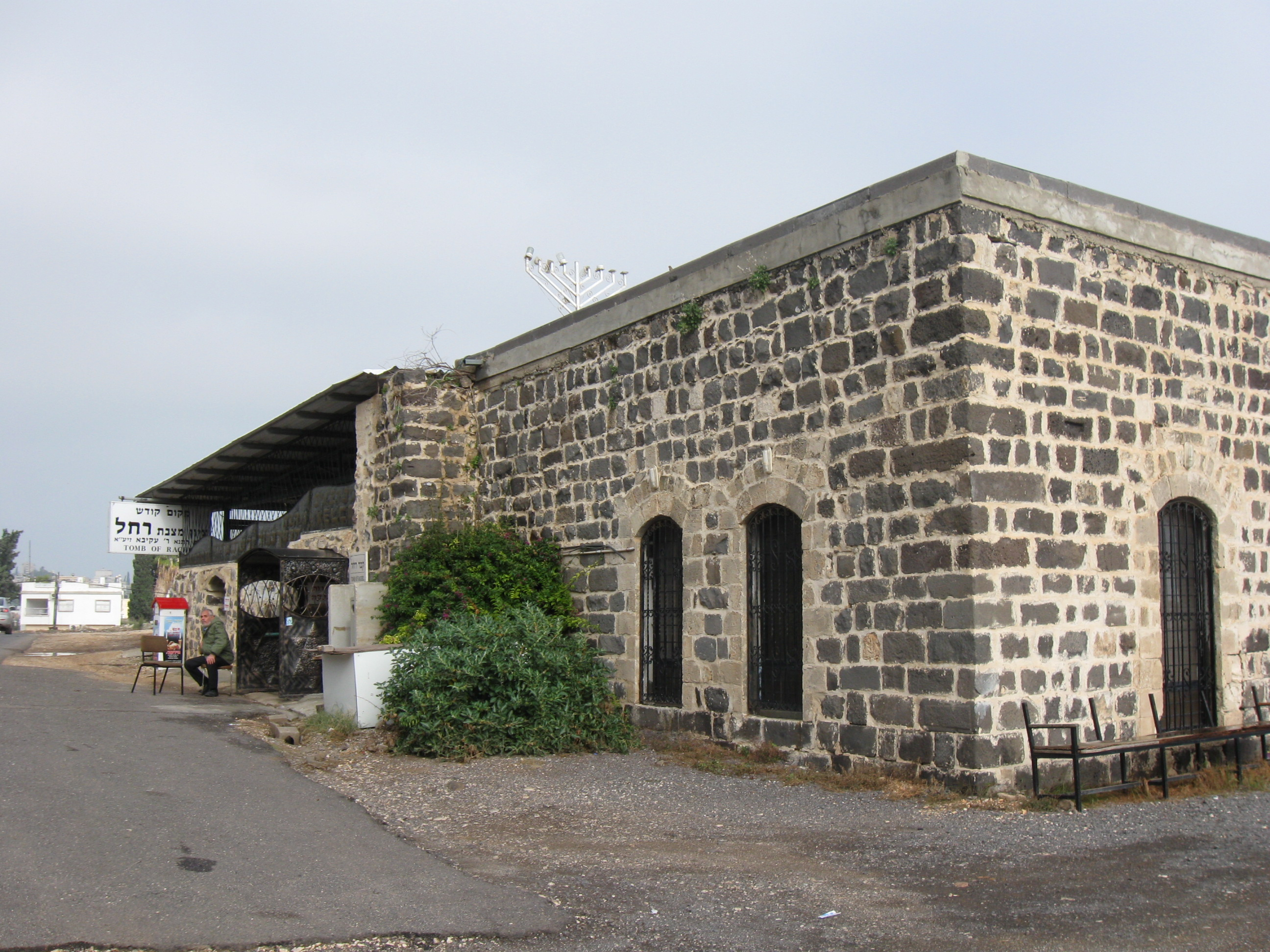
Ohel over the tomb of Rachel, wife of Rabbi Akiva, in Tiberias

Rachel's date of death is unknown. Her Yom Hillula (annual commemoration of death) has been arbitrarily set on the third day of Passover.

The tomb of Rachel is located in Tiberias Ancient Jewish Cemetery, a short distance from the tomb of Rabbi Meir Ba'al HaNes, one of Akiva's disciples. Akiva's tomb is located in the same city in a different location. The rectangular-shaped tomb was in a state of neglect for many years until Rabbi Refael Cohen, a Tiberas kashrut inspector, "rediscovered" it in 1993 in a disused Muslim cemetery and convinced a London donor to refurbish it. Muslim religious leaders claimed the site was originally a shrine to Lady Sakina (d. 745 in Medina), a relative of Muhammad. However, the placement of twelve windows in the ohel (structure over the tomb) – a typically Jewish architectural feature symbolizing the twelve tribes – indicates it was originally built by Jews and later used by Muslims. The Muslim authorities brought up the appropriation of the tomb in the Knesset, but did not pursue a court case, so "the change of identity is now a fact". As part of the refurbishment, separate spaces were created around Rachel's grave for men and women who come to pray and light candles. Bottled water from "Rachel's well", amulets, and souvenirs are sold at the site.

Rachel's tomb has become a shrine for both men and women pilgrims. Levine notes that Rachel is "[t]he emblem of saintly womanhood for traditional Judaism", as her "martyrdom consisted of waiting for him in poverty and chastity for twenty-four years while he was off studying in the Yeshiva". Smith speculates that the themes of "self-sacrifice" and "silent suffering" in Rachel's life bring "solace" to female pilgrims who can better connect with a female saint than a male one.

== In popular culture ==
In 2008 a "Jerusalem of Gold" postage stamp was issued in Israel depicting Rachel wearing the diadem and reprinting the words of Akiva from the Talmud, promising to buy it for her.
