= Hanina ben Hakinai =

2nd century rabbi and tanna

Hanina ben Hakinai or Hanania ben Hakinai (Hebrew: חנינא בן חכינאי) was a Tanna of the 2nd century; contemporary of Ben 'Azzai and Simeon the Yemenite. Sometimes he is cited as "ben Hakinai".

== Life ==
The identities of his early teachers are not known. From some versions of the Tosefta it appears that Tarfon was one of them, but that his regular teacher was Rabbi Akiva. It is related that he took leave of his wife and attended Akiva 12 or 13 years without communicating with his family, whom he recovered in a remarkable way. He was one of the few who, though not regularly ordained, were permitted to "argue cases before the sages".

From a comparatively late date comes the statement that Hananiah b. Ḥakinai was one of the Ten Martyrs.

== Teachings ==
Several halakhot have been preserved in his name, owing their preservation to Eleazar b. Jacob II. He also left some halakic midrashim.

Hananiah delved into the "mysteries of the Creation," concerning which he consulted R. Akiva.

According to him, God's relation to distressed Israel is expressed in Solomon's words: "A brother is born for adversity"; by "brother" is understood "Israel," for it is elsewhere said: "For my brethren and companions' sakes, I will now say, Peace be within thee".

With reference to Leviticus 5:21 ("If a soul sin, and commit a trespass against the Lord, and lie unto his neighbor," etc.), he remarks, "No man lies [acts dishonestly] against his fellow man unless he first becomes faithless to God".

== Jewish Encyclopedia bibliography ==
- W. Bacher, Ag. Tan. i. 436;
- Brüll, Mebo ha-Mishnah, i. 148;
- Z. Frankel, Darke ha-Mishnah, p. 136;
- Heilprin, Seder ha-Dorot, ii.;
- Zacuto, Yuḥasin, ed. Filipowski, pp. 36a, 65b
