= Eliezer ben Jacob I =

Eliezer ben Jacob I (Hebrew: אליעזר בן יעקב) was a Tanna of the 1st century; contemporary of Eleazar Chisma and Eliezer ben Hyrcanus, and senior to Judah ben Ilai.

Of his personal history nothing is known, except that he had seen the Temple at Jerusalem and was familiar with the specific purposes of its many apartments, a subject on which he was considered an authority. Some of the details, however, he eventually forgot, and was reminded of them by Abba Saul ben Batnit.

Simon ben Azzai, Rabbi Akiva's contemporary, relates that he had discovered a genealogical roll wherein was stated, "The Mishnah of R. Eliezer ben Jacob is only a kab [small in proportion], but clean [of all deficiencies]"; as a result, subsequent generations generally adopted Eliezer's views as law.

In the aggadah, too, he is mentioned. According to him, Deuteronomy 11:13 ("To serve Him with all your heart and with all your soul") is an admonition to the priests that, when officiating, they shall entertain no thought foreign to their duty.

Eliezer ben Jacob bequeathed to Israel many agrarian laws, such as the laws concerning the bringing of the Bikkurim to Jerusalem and who is eligible to recite the Avowal, as well as the laws concerning Kil'ayim grown in a vineyard.

He is buried near the old Kefar Hanaiah, in Galilee.
