= Eleazar ben Perata I =

Religious and intellectual

Eleazar ben Perata I (Hebrew: אלעזר בן פרטא) was a tanna of the third generation (2nd century), junior contemporary of Eleazar of Modi'im and of Jose the Galilean.

== Biography ==
Eleazar lived through the period when, according to a younger contemporary, the performance of circumcision was punished by the Romans with the sword; the study of Jewish law, with the stake; the celebration of Passover, with crucifixion; and the observance of the Feast of Booths, with the scourge. Still, Eleazar faithfully adhered to the teachings of his religion. Once he was arrested and cast into prison, where he met Hananiah ben Teradion. He tried to instill hope into his fellow prisoner's breast, because there was only one charge against him, that of teaching the Law, while himself he considered lost, because there were five counts against him. Hananiah, on the contrary, thought that Eleazar's chances of escape were better than his own; and the sequel proved that he was right. Hananiah was condemned to a terrible death, while Eleazar was acquitted.

== Teachings ==
Eleazar's studies embraced both halakah and aggadah, mostly the latter. One of his homilies warns against calumny in these words: "Observe how mighty are the consequences of the evil tongue. Learn them from the fate of the spies. Of the spies it is related, 'Those men who made evil report regarding the land, died by the plague before the Lord.' And of what had they spoken evil? Of trees and of stones. If, now, those who slandered dumb objects were punished so severely, how much greater must be the punishment of him who slanders his neighbor, his equal!"

He drew practical lessons also from Scriptural texts. On a certain Sabbath some prominent Jews, having just learned that the Romans were seeking them, applied to Eleazar for legal advice as to the permissibility of flight from danger on the Sabbath. Eleazar referred them to Scriptural history: "Why do you inquire of me? Look at Jacob, at Moses, and at David, and see what they did under similar circumstances!"
