= Halafta =

1st- and 2nd-century Mishnah rabbi

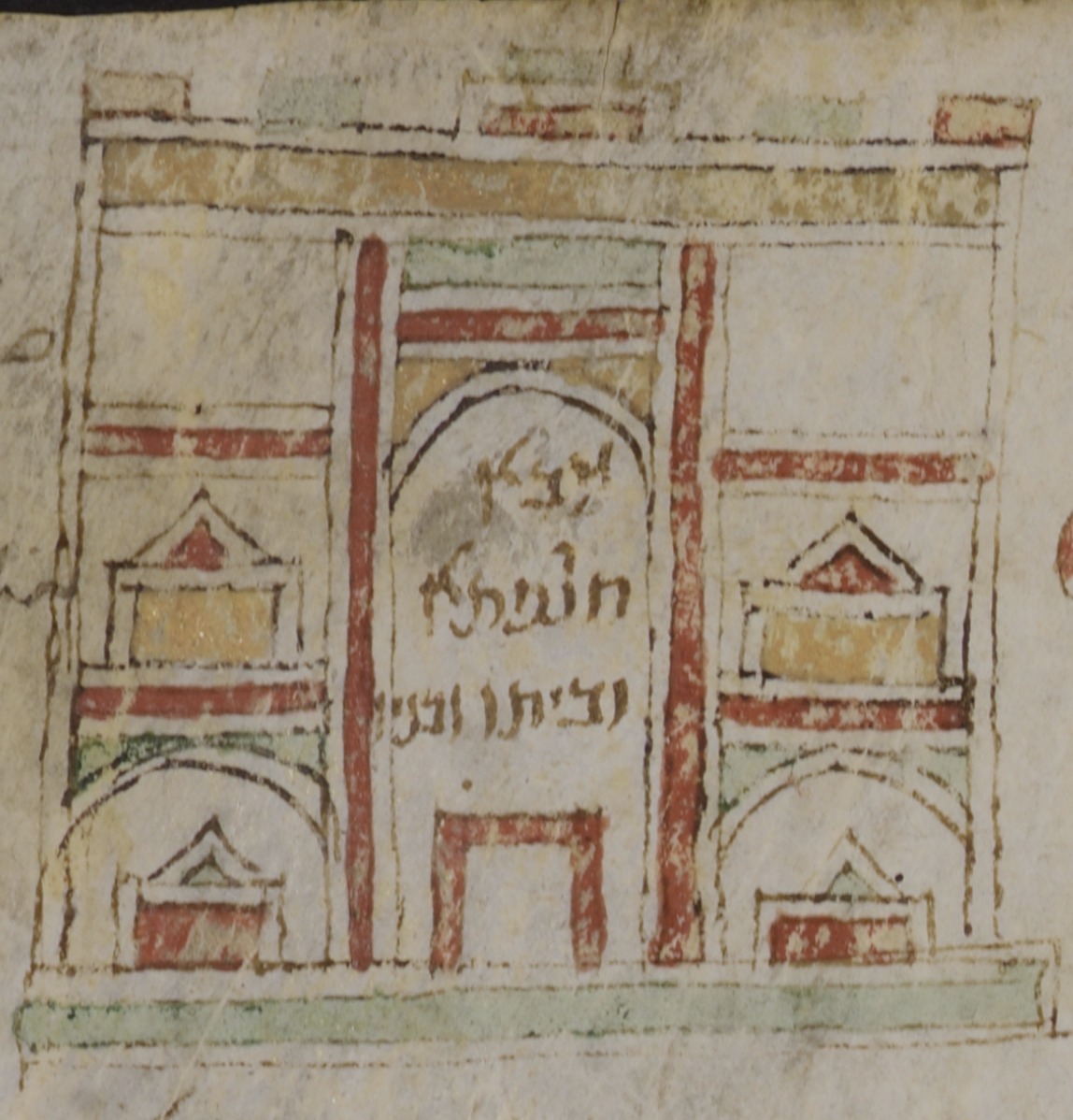
Helpetha's tomb in the "Florence Scroll", a c. 1315 Jewish pilgrimage guide

Helpetha I (Aramaic: חֶלְפְּתָא, romanized: 'Helpetha, lit. 'willow'), (Note: Also חַלְפְּתָא 'Halpetha, חֳלְפְּתָה 'Holpetha, or ז/חלפותא.) commonly mispronounced Halafta, was a rabbi who lived in Sepphoris in the Galilee during the late 1st and early 2nd centuries CE (second generation of tannaim). He was the father of Jose ben Helpetha and Shimon ben Helpetha, also serving as their teacher. He is cited without patronymic or cognomen in the Mishnah, but as Abba Helpetha in the Talmuds.

In Derekh Eretz Rabbah a certain Abba Helpetha cites his father Abba Hagra, (Note: MS גרא, חיגרא, אגרא, גמדה. Vilna (mis?)prints חגרת.) and the same Helpetha ben Hagra cites Johanan ben Nuri in t. Bava Kamma 9:31 and b. Shabbat 105b. According to Paul Romanoff, Helpetha I and Helpetha ben Hagra are the same person, but most other scholars disagree. Helpetha I is certainly not to be confused with any of the scholars named "Helpetha of Kiruya", (Note: In the Vienna Tosefta, Makhshirin 3:2: חילפתא בן קוינה. In the editio princeps (misprinted?): חילפתא בן קוינח. In Samson of Sens (6:2): חלפתא בן קוניא. In Menahem Meiri's introduction to Avot, editio princeps: חלפתא בן קבינה, MS קרינא. Can perhaps be identified with the אבא חליפא/חלפיי/חילפי/חילפיי/חילפא/חלקיה who was מן קוריא/קירויא/קרויא/קורייה or בן קרויא/קרויה, mentioned in y. Maaser Sheni 4:1, b. Bava Batra 123a, t. Maaser Sheni 4:2, Bereishit Rabbah passim, etc. See Ratner, Ahavat Zion Virushalayim vol. XII p. 183, but the citations appear to vary widely in date.) or with "Helpetha ben Shaul" and "Helpetha of Huna", later scholars. In the printed m. Avot, "Helpetha ben Dosa of Kfar Hananiah", but according to Moses da Rieti, "Helpetha ben Dosa" was from Tamarta, and Helpetha of Kfar Hananiah is Helpetha I.

His descent is traced back to Jonadab the Rechabite. He was a senior contemporary of Gamaliel II and Johanan ben Nuri and conducted a rabbinic school at Sepphoris. Here he introduced some ritual reforms.

Tradition relates that, together with Hananiah ben Teradion and Eleazar ben Mattai, he saw the monuments which Joshua had placed in the Jordan River.

Helpetha seems to have attained an advanced age. He communicated to Gamaliel II an order given by his grandfather Gamaliel I, and which he had himself heard in the last years of Judea's independence; he subsequently participated in the Akavia controversy, and later he is met with in the company of Eleazar ben Azariah, Ḥoẓpit the Interpreter, Yeshebab, and Johanan ben Nuri, when they were old. But few halakhot are preserved in his name, and most of these were transmitted by his more famous son, Jose.

One of Jose's sons was named Helpetha after his grandfather, but he died young.
