= Aha b. Rava =

Babylonian rabbi

Rav Aha b. Rava (or Rav Aha b'reih deRava; Hebrew: רב אחא בריה דרבא) was a Babylonian rabbi (sixth and seventh generation of amoraim).

== Biography ==
His name indicates that he was the son of Rava. Some believe this was the famous Rava who argued with Abaye; others say it was a different Rava.

His teachers included Rav Kahana III, Rav Ashi, Amemar, and Mar Zutra. His colleagues included Ravina I. After Mar Zutra's death, he took Mar Zutra's place as head of the Pumbedita yeshiva.

He is recorded as debating the behavior of ants, criticizing the methodology of an experiment which R' Shimon ben Halafta had performed to determine their social patterns.
