= Segan =

Deputy to the Israelite High Priest

The Aramaic term segan (סגן) or segan hakohanim (Hebrew: סגן הכהנים) is a title used in the Talmud to refer to the priest serving as the deputy to the High Priest of Israel.

== Hebrew Bible ==
The form segan is Aramaic (סְגַן), appearing 5 times in the Hebrew Bible in the Aramaic sections of the Book of Daniel to refer to officers of the Babylonian government. The Hebrew form sagan (סָגָן) occurs a further 17 times in Nehemiah and elsewhere, again to refer to officials of the Babylonian rulers.

== Talmud ==
According to the Talmud the deputy was appointed to the position of the segan ha-kohanim with the responsibility of overseeing the actions of the work of the Temple's priests' staff, as well as a stand-in position, ready to take the role of High Priest in case he will be found unfit to serve the holy work on the temple, and thus, the Segan was only second to the High Priest, as Rabbi Hanina Segan ha-Kohanim (40 – 80 CE) attests:

R. Hanina the segan of the priests said: Why is a segan ever appointed ? In case the high-priest became unfit for service, the segan should enter at once to do the service.

Many times the title commonly appears on the classical texts as ha-Segan ("the Deputy"), instead of the full title of Segan ha-Kohanim', for example on the Mishnah, in an halakha that deals with the work of the High Priest on Yom Kippur:

"...The deputy and the high priest put their hand into the urn. If the lot [‘For the Lord’] comes up in the hand of the high priest, the deputy said to him: Sir high priest, raise thy hand! And if it came up in the right hand of the deputy, the head of the [ministering] family says to him: Say your word."

One can also note the importance given to the matter in the ritual ceremony of visiting mourners, in which the High Priest takes part in:

"When he passes along the row to comfort others, the Segan and the former High Priest stand on his right; while the Rosh-Beit-Av, the mourners, and all the people are on his left. And when he stands in the row to be comforted by others, the Segan is stationed on his right and the Rosh Beit Av and all the public on his left."

Two prominent Segans are noted in the Talmud and in Josephus Flavius' work: Hanina Segan ha-Kohanim, and Eleazar ben Hanania (son of Hananiah b. Hezekiah b. Garon who served as High Priest).

== See also ==
- High Priest (Judaism)
- Hanina Segan ha-Kohanim
- Eleazar ben Hanania
