= Johanan ben Nuri =

Rabbi Yochanan ben Nuri (Hebrew: יוחנן בן נורי) was a tanna of the 1st and 2nd centuries.

== Biography ==
He initially studied under the watch of Rabban Gamliel of Yavne and senior of Rabbi Akiva, and later took up residence in Beit She'arim (Roman-era Jewish village). A great halakist, always provided with satisfactory answers to all questions, he was familiarly called "pedler's basket" or "bundle of halakot"; the number and diversity of halakot cited under his name in the Mishnah alone, about 40, justify those titles. Besides exhaustive rabbinical knowledge, he acquired familiarity with the general science of his time, especially geometry. It was said of him, as of his colleague R. Eleazar Chisma, that he could approximately state the number of drops contained in the sea.

Also like R. Eleazar Chisma, he was very poor. Through the influence of R. Joshua ben Hananiah both were appointed by Rabban Gamliel to remunerative offices.

Rabbi Johanan showed himself grateful to Rabban Gamliel. When, after that patriarch's death, Rabbi Joshua proposed a change in a rule established by Rabban Gamliel, Rabbi Johanan opposed him: "I have observed that the head is always followed by the body; as long as Rabban Gamliel lived we observed the rule laid down by him, and now you propose to veto his directions. Joshua, we shall not listen to you". Close scholarly relations also existed between him and R. Halafta.

He was very pious, and therefore later rabbis said that when one dreams of Rabbi Johanan ben Nuri one may hope to develop a wholesome fear of sin.

== Teachings ==
In his discussions of halakhot, Rabbi Johanan considered expediency and economy as well as law and authority. When Rabbi Tarfon declared that only olive oil was appropriate for the Shabbat-lamp, Rabbi Johanan became impatient: "And what shall the Babylonians do where none but sesame-oil is to be had; and what shall the Medians do, who have nothing but nut-oil; and the Alexandrians, who have nothing but radish-oil; or the Cappadocians, who have only naphtha?". On another occasion, when Rabbi Akiva suggested that a married woman who has become the common talk of the "spinsters by the moon" ought to be divorced, Johanan remarked, "In that case there is no chance for a daughter of Judah to live with a husband! Only where infidelity is fully established by legal evidence may a divorce be imposed".

In the aggadah he is not often cited.

Some of his halachic teachings are notable even though they are not accepted in practice. He ruled that not only the five species of grain, but also rice and millet, could become chametz. He ruled that in the mussaf prayer of Rosh Hashana, the malchuyot verses should be recited in the third blessing (kedushat hashem) rather than the fourth (kedushat hayom).
