= Rabbinic stance on Bar Kokhba Revolt =

Views of Chazal on the Third Jewish revolt against Rome

The rabbinic movement's stance on Bar Kokhba Revolt is unclear based on seemingly contradictory Talmudic sources. However, the revolt strengthened the rabbis' position as the dominant Jewish sect. Most researchers believe Rabbi Akiva's students participated in the revolt and died fighting. A minority hold they died earlier of plague, unrelated to the revolt.

== The stance of the rabbinic movement ==
Regarding the participation and positions of the rabbinic movement, the heirs of the Pharisees, Peter Schäfer noted that the Talmudic literature is not generous in providing information about Bar Kokhba himself. And Bar Kokhba's own letters make no mention of the sages of Yavneh. There are contradictory Talmudic sources: The Babylonian Talmud shows the sages' opposition to Bar Kokhba (in Tractate Sanhedrin it is even written that the sages themselves killed him), while supporting Rabbi Akiva and certainly his students’ support of Bar Kokhba. Data from the Babylonian Talmud is less reliable than data from the Jerusalem Talmud regarding testimonies about Bar Kokhba and the revolt, for two reasons: the distance from where the events took place, and the opposition of Babylonian Jews to rebelling against the government. While it is difficult to infer the rabbis' attitude towards the revolt, there is no doubt that they were strengthened by it and progressed further towards becoming the dominant sect in Judea, a status they finally achieved in the third century.

== Early testimonies – Bar Kokhba's messianism ==
"Bar Koziba reigned two and a half years. He said to the rabbis: I am the Messiah. They said to him: It is written about the Messiah that he can smell and judge [can tell who is correct by smell], let us see if you can do so. When they saw that he could not smell and judge, they killed him." —Talmud Bavli, Sanhedrin 93b.

This testimony from the Babylonian Talmud claims that Bar Kokhba himself claimed to be the Messiah, but when it became clear that he did not have the supernatural ability to smell and judge, he was killed by the sages. This testimony should be taken with some reservation given its Babylonian origin. In fact, this fits the Babylonian Talmud's agenda. Bar Koziba's revolt essentially becomes Bar Koziba's reign over an anonymous state—the revolt itself is not mentioned at all, and no sage dares to support this messianic figure. Joshua Efron argued that this[100] is in order to sever the connection between Bar Kokhba and his rebellious and messianic delusions from the spiritual leaders of the Jewish people.

"It was taught: Rabbi Shimon ben Yochai used to interpret the verse "The path of a star comes from Jacob" (Numbers 24:17) as "The path of Bar Koziva comes from Jacob." Rabbi Akiva, when he would see Bar Koziba, would say: "This is the King Messiah." Rabbi Yochanan ben Torta said to him: "Akiva, grass will grow on your cheeks and the son of David still will not have come." —Jerusalem Talmud, Ta'anit 4:5.

This is clear and unambiguous testimony that Rabbi Akiva, one of the greatest sages of his generation and of Judaism throughout the generations, a contemporary of Bar Kokhba, explicitly declared that Bar Kokhba is the King Messiah. Based on this source, Maimonides made his famous statements about Bar Kokhba in his "Laws of Kings":

"Do not imagine that the King Messiah needs to perform signs and wonders, bring about new phenomena in the world, resurrect the dead, and the like... For Rabbi Akiva, a great sage of the Mishna, was a supporter of Bar Koziba the king, and he would say of him that he is the King Messiah, until he was killed for his sins. Once he was killed they realized he was not the one, for the Sages did not ask of him neither sign nor miracle." —Mishneh Torah, Hilkhot Melakhim 11:3.

Maimonides preferred the testimony of the Jerusalem Talmud and completely ignored the testimony that appears in the Babylonian Talmud, and the idea that according to their method, the Messiah should be a miraculous and wondrous figure.

Joshua Efron believes that it was Maimonides' rationalistic view of the Messianic age and the end of exile that led him to favor the Jerusalem Talmud over the Babylonian. Maimonides also said that Rabbi Akiva was a weapon-bearer for Bar Kokhba. Some interpret this literally, arguing he must have had a source which has been lost, while others see it as an allegorical expression of Rabbi Akiva's great support for Bar Kokhba.

According to Maimonides, the Messiah has to be a Jewish king, based on the Biblical model of the Messiah, primarily referring to the first kings of the united Kingdom of Israel—Saul and David. These kings were anointed upon their coronation with sacred anointing oil by the prophet Samuel, and both of them were military men who saved the nation from its enemies. Thus, the Jewish Messianic hope was for an earthly Messiah who would redeem the people from their troubles, and at its height rebuild Jerusalem and the Temple, not a divine-spiritual Messiah who would bring about the miraculous. Many scholars such as Oppenheimer and Efron share this view.

== Additional sources and conclusion ==
The Jerusalem Talmud recounts that Rabbi Elazar Hamodai stayed in Betar and was very close to Bar Kokhba, even praying daily for the revolt's success – leading to the conclusion that Rabbi Elazar Hamodai, one of the sages, supported the revolt.

In the Jerusalem Talmud, Rabban Shimon ben Gamliel testifies from first-hand experience about being a child in Betar who survived the revolt's horrors, and Gedaliah Alon wrote that this indicates the Chief Rabbi (Nasi)'s residence was in the besieged city, signaling his support of the revolt.

After examining these testimonies, most researchers estimate the sages did support Bar Kokhba. Oppenheimer believes the sages' support for the revolt was inevitable due to its religious-halachic nature – its causes and consequences (the decree of persecution). Additionally, besides the sages' support of the revolt, Bar Kokhba briefly governed a state after years of foreign rule, and this requires halachic involvement that only the sages could provide.

Similarly, Yisrael Friedman Ben-Shalom argues that the meticulous, covert preparations for the revolt and the prolonged resilience against the mighty Roman army necessitated cooperation by the entire nation under unified leadership. The leadership that united the people before and after Bar Kokhba was the sages – so it is illogical that for a short period the people's loyalty shifted elsewhere. Also, there is no decisive, indigenous testimony opposing Bar Kokhba's leadership and the revolt itself, even after its failure, due to the sages' support. In contrast, contradicting testimonies are quite late. Thus, Ben-Shalom writes: "A revolt that amazingly united most of the nation for the final war against the 'evil kingdom' – was a revolt in which the Pharisees played a major role."

From Bar Kokhba's letters, he seems to have been meticulous regarding many commandments, including some enacted at Yavneh. Some argue Bar Kokhba emphasized commandments with nationalistic features. Peter Schäfer analyzes Bar Kokhba's adopted title "Nasi" – a title unused before or after the revolt (since Hasmonean times) that later became used by the sages – perhaps indicating a lack of conflict between the sides.

David Goodblatt argues a minority opinion that the sages did not support the revolt, which was actually led by priests rather than Pharisees. He discounts contradicting Talmudic evidence and relies on numismatic testimony, with one revolt leader being Elazar the Priest. Schäfer summarizes that active rabbinic participation in the revolt cannot be proven, however likely, and the priesthood must have played a decisive role.

== Criticism by the sages ==
Despite generally supporting the revolt, the sages did not refrain from criticizing Bar Kokhba when he acted improperly in their view.

In the previously cited quote, two opinions were given about Bar Kokhba: Rabbi Akiva saw him as the one to redeem Israel, while Rabbi Yochanan ben Torta claimed redemption was still far off and would not occur in Rabbi Akiva's generation. According to Oppenheimer, this disagreement is not just on religious grounds about whether Bar Kokhba is the Messiah, but an ideological-political argument, meaning Rabbi Yochanan ben Torta rejected Bar Kokhba's leadership and opposed the revolt. Many emphasize that the view of Rabbi Akiva, one of the generation's leaders and backbone of Oral Torah with many supporters and disciples, should be weighed against an anonymous sage known primarily for this disagreement. Maimonides, for example, gave Rabbi Akiva's position central importance.

There is another testimony describing cooperation between the sages and Bar Kokhba on military matters:

"Rabbi Yochanan said: The voice of Hadrian Caesar killed eight hundred thousand myriads in Betar. Rabbi Yochanan said: Eighty thousand pairs of horn blowers surrounded Betar, and each one was in charge of several brigades. Bar Koziba was there, and he had two hundred thousand men who could cut off their fingers. The sages sent word to him: How long will you make the people of Israel crippled?! He said to them: What can I do? They said to him: Whoever cannot ride on his horse and uproot a cedar of Lebanon should not be enlisted in your army. He had two hundred thousand of this sort and two hundred thousand of that sort." —Jerusalem Talmud, Ta'anit 4:5.

This describes Bar Kokhba's "admission tests" to his army. Initially. his soldiers had to cut off a finger as an admission test, but the sages’ objection led Bar Kokhba to consult them on an alternative test. Their response was that a worthy soldier must uproot a cedar while riding on his horse. Though parts of this legend are difficult to accept, like riding on a horse and uprooting a cedar, the story's essence is significant. Based on this testimony, some researchers including Ben-Shalom conclude that the sages’ reprimand of Bar Kokhba's "admission tests" rather than the revolt itself, and his heeding their words indicate their participation in the revolt.

Another testimony about Bar Kokhba is the story of the siege of Betar and Bar Kokhba's downfall:

"For three and a half years Hadrian surrounded Betar. Rabbi Elazar Hamodai would sit on sackcloth and ashes and pray every day, saying: Lord of the Universe, do not sit in judgment today! Hadrian wanted to leave. A Samaritan said to him: Don’t leave! I’ll show you what to do to capture the city. He entered the city through a sewer pipe. He found Rabbi Elazar Hamodai standing in prayer. The Samaritan acted as if whispering in his ear. The townspeople saw this and brought him to Bar Koziba. They said to him: We saw this elder conversing with your friend. Bar Koziba said to the Samaritan: What did you say to him and what did he say to you? The Samaritan said: If I tell you, the king will kill me, and if not, you will kill me. Better the king kills me and not you. The Samaritan added and said: He told me he will surrender the city. Bar Koziba came to Rabbi Elazar Hamodai and said: What did this Samaritan say to you? Rabbi Elazar said: Nothing! Bar Koziba said: What did you say to him? Rabbi Elazar: Nothing! Bar Koziba kicked him once and killed him. Immediately a heavenly voice emerged and said (Zechariah 11:17): "Woe to the worthless shepherd who forsakes the flock! A sword upon his arm and upon his right eye! His arm will wither and his right eye will grow dim." You killed Rabbi Elazar Hamodai, the arm and right eye of Israel. Therefore, that man's arm will wither and his right eye grow dim. Immediately Betar was captured and Bar Koziba killed." —Jerusalem Talmud, Ta'anit, 4:4.

On the one hand, Rabbi Elazar Hamodai's support for the revolt is evident, but the conflict between the sides and the sage's killing by Bar Kokhba provide clear signs of tension between the sages and Bar Kokhba. This tension even leads to the sages' interpretation of Bar Kokhba's death and the revolt's failure according to some accounts.

Additional criticism is brought that Bar Kokhba would say before battles: "Master of the Universe, neither help nor hinder us." From the proximity to the Rabbi Elazar Hamodai story, this also seems to be criticism.

== Participation of Rabbi Akiva's students in the revolt ==
According to Jewish sources, Rabbi Akiva had 24,000 students who died in a short period between Passover and Shavuot, because they did not show proper respect for one another.

Most researchers argue that since the Geonic period it was accepted in Judaism that Rabbi Akiva's students died at the hands of the Roman army. They rely on the Spanish version of Rav Sherira Gaon's Epistle which states: "And Rabbi Akiva raised many students, and there was a religious persecution [killing by the government] of Rabbi Akiva's students."

Rav Saadia Gaon in his commentary to the verse in Daniel (11:33) "And those of the people who understand shall instruct many; yet they shall stumble by the sword and by flame, by captivity and by spoil, many days", that this refers to the sword deaths of Rabbi Akiva and Rabbi Judah ben Baba during the Bar Kokhba Revolt, the flame is the burning of Rabbi Hanina ben Teradyon, the captivity is Rabbi Meir, and the spoil mentioned by Rabbi Ishmael. All these sages participated in the failed revolt, whose purpose was to test Israel.

Today, researchers such as Samuel Safrai, Aaron Oppenheimer, and Samuel Abramsky hold the view that Rabbi Akiva's students participated in the Bar Kokhba Revolt and died in battle. This was also the view of Rabbis Zvi Yehuda Kook and his student Moshe Zvi Neriah, who cited additional Talmudic sources that Rabbi Akiva and his students supported and participated in the revolt, and were persecuted even after its suppression.

Other scholars such as Gedaliah Alon believe they died of plague before the revolt, unrelated to it.
