= Hanina Segan ha-Kohanim =

Priest

Hanina [Hananyah] Segan ha-Kohanim (Hebrew: ר' חנינא (חנניה) סגן הכהנים, lit. "R. Hanina (Hananiah) [the] Segan (Deputy) Ha-Kohanim (High priest)") was of the first Generation of the Jewish Tanna sages. He was the father of Rabbi Simeon ben ha-Segan.

He commented on what he had seen occur during the destruction of the Second Temple of Jerusalem. The book Yihusei Tanna'im ve-Amora'im says that he was killed along with Shimon ben Gamliel and Ishmael ben Elisha ha-Kohen. It is also said that he was one of the Ten Martyrs, and was killed on the 25th of Sivan (late spring).

Hanina earned his title due to the role he fulfilled - as Deputy to the Kohen Gadol (High priest) in the Temple. Ha-Segan was a position with the responsibility of overseeing the actions of the work of the Temple priest staff, as well as a stand-in position, ready to take the role of High priest in case the incumbent was found unfit to perform his functions on the temple. Hanina was considered a "Segan Ha-Kohanim", only second to the High priest, as he himself said: "R. Hanina the Segan of the priests said: Why a 'Segan' [Deputy] is ever appointed? In case the high-priest became unfit for service, the 'Segan' Deputy should enter at once to do the service".

== See also ==
- Segan
