= Shimon ben Halafta =

2nd century Judean rabbi

Rabbi Shimon ben Helpetha
- רבי שמעון בן חלפתא
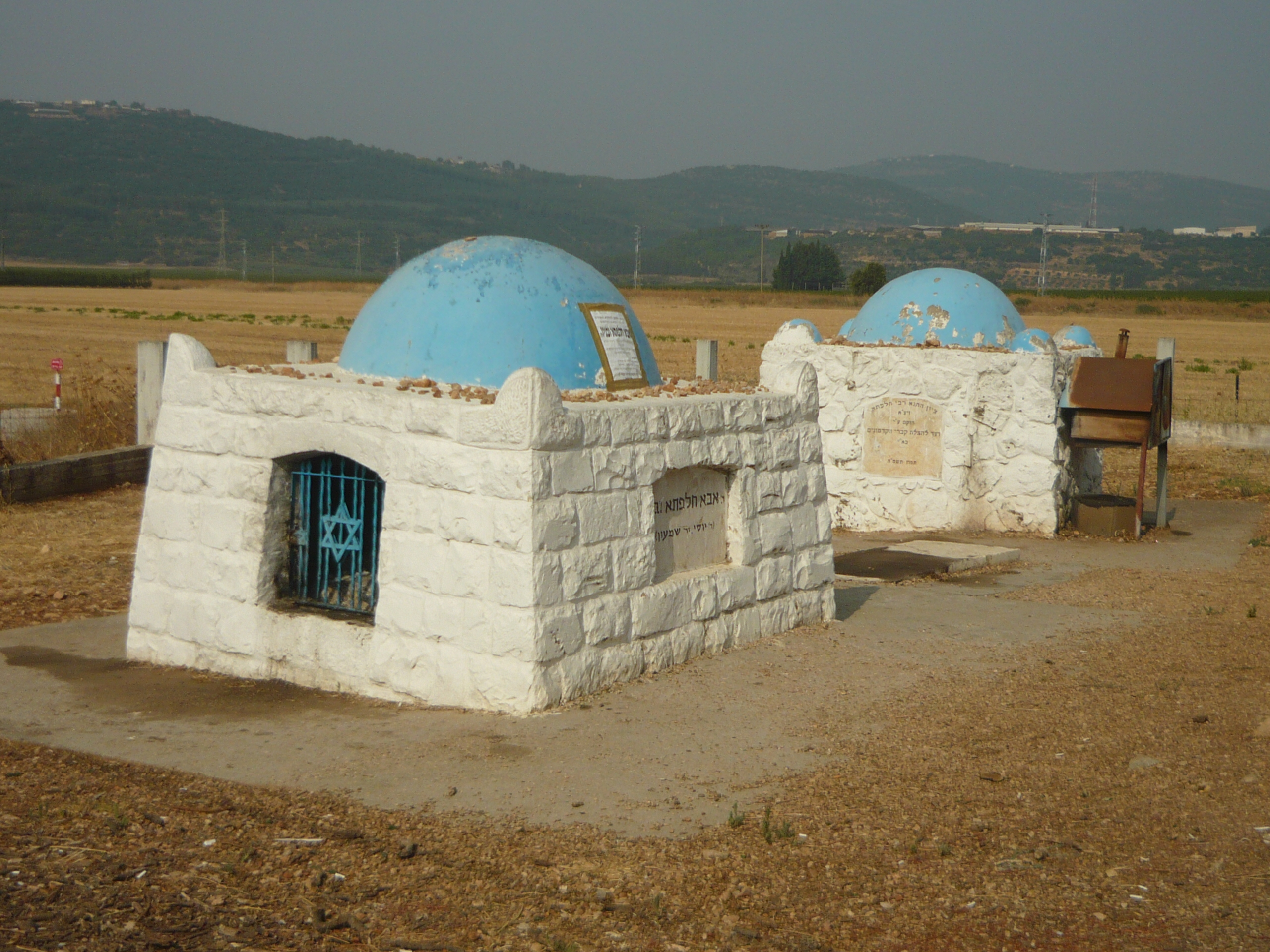
- Title: Tana

Personal life
- Buried: Safed Old Jewish Cemetery

Religious life
- Religion: Judaism

Shimon ben Helpetha, (Note: See Halafta for pronunciations.) commonly known as Shimon ben Halafta, was a rabbi who lived in the 2nd century CE (fourth generation of tannaim).

== His life ==
Little is known of his life, but a number of stories are recorded involving him, often involving miracles.

He was the brother of R' Jose ben Halafta and the son of R' Halafta. He lived in Ein Teenah, which some identify with modern-day עין תינה in the Golan Heights.

He was obese. Once on a hot day, he asked his daughter to fan him, offering to pay her for this service with packages of nard spices. Suddenly the wind blew, and he exclaimed, "How many packages of nard do I owe to the master of the wind (God)?"

He was extremely poor. It is said that once he did not have money for Shabbat expenses, and upon praying he was miraculously given a precious stone. However, his wife refused to use the stone, so as not to have his reward in this world detract from his reward in the world to come. He prayed again, and the stone was miraculously taken back.

It is reported that once he was confronted by lions while traveling. He prayed, and two cuts of meat miraculously descended from heaven. The lions ate one, allowing him to escape. He took the second cut to the beit midrash, where it was ruled kosher to eat.

He was known as the "researcher of matters", and would perform various experiments to understand nature better. He once performed an experiment to determine the social patterns of ants, but a later rabbi, Rav Aha b. Rava, criticized its methodology.

=== Burial Place ===
In the book "Toledot Eretz Yisrael" (circa 1270–1320), it is claimed that Rabbi Shimon was buried in Kfar Hananya alongside his family.

Rabbi Chaim Vital, in his book Sha'ar HaGilgulim, presents his teacher the Ari version, stating that Rabbi Shimon is buried in the ancient cemetery in Safed: "When you go from Safed, towards the west to the aforementioned cemetery, there is a well called Bor shel Guizo, and slightly further to the west, Rabbi Shimon ben Chalafta is buried, without any marker."

In the book "Holy Places and Graves of the Righteous in the Galilee," it is written that the burial area in the cemetery mentioned by Rabbi Chaim Vital was located and marked. The location was identified with the help of writings from pilgrims, describing the area not far from the graves of Rabbi Yehoshua ben Hananiah and Beeri.

A pilgrim who visited Safed in 1891 describes the burial area of Rabbi Shimon in his book "Mora Derech Le'Eretz Yisrael" (A.M. Lunz) and adds that he was buried with his father.

== Teachings ==
He is known for his aggadic teachings, particularly those regarding the value of peace.

=== Quotes ===
- The Holy One - blessed be He - found no better vessel in which to hold blessing for Israel than peace.
- Great is peace, for when the Holy One - blessed be He - created His world, He made peace between the upper and the lower world... On the second day He created from the upper world... on the third day He created from the lower world... on the fourth day from the upper world... on the fifth day from the lower world... On the sixth day He came to create man. He said: If I create him from the upper world, the upper world will have one more creation than the lower world; if I create him from the lower world, the lower world will have one more creation than the upper world. What did He do? He created him from the upper world and the lower world. As it says: "The Lord God fashioned man dust from the earth" - from the lower world; "and blew in his nose the breath of life" - from the upper world.
