= Judah ben Dama =

Judah ben Dama (died 24 May 136) was one of the Ten Martyrs slain in the Jewish literary work, the Midrash Eleh Ezkerah.
