= Ishmael ben Elisha HaKohen =

Leader of the first generation of the Tannaim

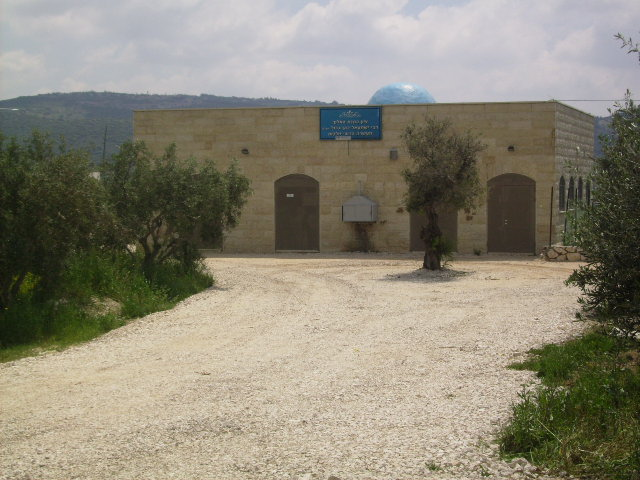
Tomb of Ishmael ben Elisha HaKohen

Ishmael ben Elisha HaKohen (Hebrew: רבי ישמעאל בן אלישע כהן גדול, "Rabbi Ishmael ben Elisha Kohen Gadol", lit. "Rabbi Ishmael ben (son of) Elisha [the] Kohen (priest)"; sometimes in short Ishmael HaKohen, lit. "Ishmael the Priest") was one of the prominent leaders of the first generation of the Tannaim.

Jewish tradition describes his father as High Priest in the Second Temple of Jerusalem, although no High Priest by the name Elisha is historically known. In the Talmud, he describes how he once entered the Holy of Holies, where God asked him for a blessing, and he replied by asking for God to treat Israel mercifully.

Ishmael was also one of the Ten Martyrs, along with Shimon ben Gamliel. According to Jewish tradition, his son and daughter were taken captive as slaves in the Roman conquest. As the two slaves were both extremely beautiful, their respective owners decided to mate them together and share the offspring. They were brought together at night, when they could not see each other, but refused to cohabit. When they recognized each other in the morning, they embraced each other and cried until their souls departed. This story is recited in one of the Kinnot for Tisha BeAv, entitled "Ve'Et Navi Hatati".

There are conflicting accounts of his martyrdom. The Avot of Rabbi Natan states that he and Shimon ben Gamliel were decapitated in quick succession. However, the Midrash Eleh Ezkerah relates that the Caesar's daughter was so taken by Ishmael's beauty that she ordered his head be skinned while he was still alive so that she could stuff it with straw and preserve it, and this is how Ishmael died. The Eleh Ezkerah is, however, known for its use of poetic license at the expense of historical accuracy, and its author(s) probably changed the narrative in order to produce a greater effect upon the mind of the reader.

Ishmael's traditional tomb is located in the Druze village of Sajur in the Upper Galilee.

== See also ==
- 3 Enoch
