= Jeshbab the Scribe =

2nd century Jewish Tanna sage

Jeshbab the Scribe (or Yeshbab the Scribe, Hebrew: יְשֵבָב הַסוֹפֵר, Yəšēḇāḇ haSōfēr) was a third generation Jewish Tanna sage, at the beginning of the 2nd century C.E. He was a disciple of Joshua ben Hananiah and a colleague of Rabbi Akiva.

The name is also sometimes spelled Jeshebeab.

Jeshbab was benevolent, and had handed out all his property to the needy, a deed that was not viewed with favour by his colleagues. Once he wished to hand a fifth of his property to the needy, and R. Akiva ben Joseph did not allow him to do so.

Jeshbab is accounted among the Ten Martyrs.
