= Rabbi Meir =

2nd century Jewish rabbi

Rabbi Meir (Hebrew: רַבִּי מֵאִיר) was a Jewish sage who lived in the time of the Mishnah. He was one of the Tannaim of the fourth generation (139–163), and a disciple of Rabbi Akiva, Rabbi Ishmael and of Rabbi Haninah ben Teradion. He is the second most frequently mentioned sage in the Mishnah and is mentioned over 3,000 times in the Babylonian Talmud. His wife Bruriah is one of the few women cited in the Gemara.

== Biography ==
According to the Talmud, his father was a descendant of the Roman Emperor Nero who, it is said, escaped death at the time of his deposition and became subsequently a convert to Judaism. Azariah de Rossi and David Gans propose that Nero may have converted to Judaism secretly, explaining the lack of historical evidence. Maimonides and Chaim Kanievsky affirm the Talmudic claim, asserting that Rabbi Meir was Nero’s direct descendant, while Menahem Azariah da Fano offers an allegorical interpretation, suggesting Rabbi Meir was a reincarnation of Nero rather than a literal descendant. Some modern scholars view the story as a rabbinic motif linking a non-Jewish figure to a Jewish sage, emphasizing its symbolic rather than historical significance.

Twenty four thousand students of Rabbi Akiva died in a plague. He found five new students, including Meir and Rabbis Judah ben Ilai, Eleazar ben Shammua, Jose ben Halafta, and Shimon bar Yochai.

Meir entered the school of Rabbi Akiva, then went to the school of Rabbi Ishmael. During this time, Meir held the profession of a scrivener, copying principally sacred script, for which he was admonished: "My son, pay particular heed to your profession, since your profession is the work of heaven; lest perhaps you leave out one letter, or else you add one superfluous letter, and in so doing you find that you have destroyed thereby the entire world." He then returned to Akiva, who, recognizing his dialectical powers, ordained him over the heads of his other disciples. This ordination, which was considered invalid on account of Meir's youth, was confirmed by Judah ben Baba.

Unlike Akiva, Meir seems to have kept aloof from the revolutionary movement of Bar Kokhba. Nevertheless, he suffered greatly from its consequences. His father-in-law, Hananiah ben Teradion, was killed in the Hadrianic persecutions, and his sister-in-law was taken to Rome and sold to a brothel.

During the Hadrianic persecutions Meir lived abroad, but he returned to Judea after the repeal of the oppressive edicts, and took part in the reestablishment of the Sanhedrin in the city of Usha. Shortly afterward Simeon ben Gamaliel II was elected patriarch, and Meir became a hakham, in which office he was charged with the duty of preparing the subjects to be discussed in the Sanhedrin.

In the later part of Meir's life in one day he lost two sons, who died suddenly on a Sabbath while he was at the house of study. Shortly after the death of his sons his wife died. According to a legend, she committed suicide after having been dishonored by one of her husband's pupils.

The last years of Meir's life were passed in Asia Minor. He was induced to leave Judea because of the conflict that arose between him and the patriarch over the change introduced by Simeon in the ceremonial of the Sanhedrin. Custom required its members to rise when the president, the judge, or the reader entered the academy. Simeon issued an order that the assembly should rise as a body only on his own entrance, while on the entrance of the judge only the first row, and on that of the reader only the second row, should rise. Meir and Nathan (the judge) felt offended at this new arrangement and determined to show Simeon's unfitness for his office by puzzling him with difficult halakic questions which he would be unable to answer. Informed of this, Simeon expelled them from the Sanhedrin, but he could not prevent them from writing difficult questions and distributing them among its members. Compelled to readmit both Nathan and Meir, he contrived that their names should not be recorded in the ordinances enacted by him. Nathan submitted, but Meir continued to embarrass the patriarch by addressing to him difficult questions. When, at last, the patriarch threatened excommunication, he answered, "I do not care for your sentence unless you can prove to me on whom, on what grounds, and under what conditions excommunication may be imposed," and left the Sanhedrin.

A different story in the Babylonian Talmud indicates that he was forced to flee to Babylonia due to pursuit by the Roman authorities, or due to other unclear circumstances.

== Name ==
"Meir" may have been a sobriquet. The Babylonian Talmud asserts that his actual name was not Meir but Nehorai, and that the real name of Nehorai was not Nehorai but rather Nehemiah or Eleazar ben Arach. This passage is ambiguous regarding whether Meir was renamed twice (from Nehorai and previously from another name), or whether two rabbis (Meir and Nehorai) were each renamed.

According to Yeshayah Berlin, Meir and Nehorai were separate rabbis. This reading is supported by several of the oldest Talmud manuscripts.

In contrast, modern scholar John McGinley assumes that Meir was renamed twice. To explain the renaming, McGinley notes that Eleazar ben Arach is elsewhere is described as being the greatest of the Sages, and a student of Yohanan ben Zakkai who (at an early age) had mastered the meaning of the mystical revelations which are associated with "the Work of the Chariot." McGinley suggests that the virtual disappearance of Eleazer Ben Arach from rabbinic ways allowed the usage of this name as a cognomen for Meir, acceptably to rabbinic officialdom who permitted this cover name to honor him but with sufficient indirectness so as not also to honor his checkered history with Rabbinic officialdom. The book also says that Yochanan Ben Zakai set up a bet midrash at Bror Hayil after he left Yavneh. Meir was not a student of Zakai at Yavneh.

== Teachings ==
=== Halacha ===
First a disciple of Elisha ben Abuyah and later of Rabbi Akiva, Meir was one of the most important Tannaim of the Mishnah. Akiva's teachings, through his pupil Meir, became the basis of the Mishnah.

According to the Babylonian Talmud, all Mishnas that state laws without introducing them with an indication that they are attributed to any one of the Sages are attributed to Meir. Following an unsuccessful attempt to force the resignation of the head of the Sanhedrin, Meir's opinions were noted, but not in his name, rather as "Others say...". However, in a few places the opinion of "Others" is recorded alongside a contradictory opinion of "Rabbi Meir", suggesting that this identification is not universal.

Meir "was able to give 48 reasons to prove a thing legally clean, and as many more reasons to prove it unclean". This excess of dialectics is given in the Talmud as the only reason why his halakhot did not receive the force of law; the pros and cons offered by him were so nearly equal in strength that one never knew his real opinion on a subject.

In the deduction of new halakhot from the Biblical text, Meir used with great caution the hermeneutic rules listed by his teacher Ishmael; and he rejected Akiva's method of deducing a new halakhah from a seemingly superfluous particle in the Scriptural text.

=== Quotes ===
- Why was the Torah given to Israel? Because they are impetuous.
- He that occupies himself in the study of the Torah for its own sake merits many things; still more, he is deserving of the whole world. He is called friend, beloved, lover of God, lover of mankind, he that makes God happy, he that makes mankind happy; and it clothes him with humility and with reverence, and makes him fit to become a pious man, saintly, upright, and faithful, while keeping him away from sin and bringing him near to virtue; while others enjoying from him counsel and sound knowledge, understanding and [deriving from him] fortitude...
- "Have little business, and be busied in the Torah"; "Be lowly in spirit to every man"; "If thou idlest from the Torah, thou wilt have many idlers against thee"; "If thou laborest in the Torah, He hath much to give unto thee"
- "He who does not work on week-days will end by being compelled to work even on Sabbaths; for idleness leads to misery, and misery to crime; and once a prisoner, the idler will be forced to labor even on the Sabbath".
- "It is not the trade followed but the merit of the workman which makes him rich or poor".

Other maxims of his, on study and the fear of the Lord, have been transmitted by Johanan: "Learn the ways of the Lord with thy whole heart and with thy whole soul"; "Watch at the gates of the Law"; "Keep the Law in thy heart"; "Let the fear of the Lord be always before thine eyes and keep thy tongue from evil words"; "Cleanse and make thyself pure that thou mayest stand without sin before the Lord, and He will be with thee"

Meir reproved those who run after riches:

- "Man comes into the world with closed hands as though claiming ownership of everything; but he leaves it with hands open and limp, as if to show that he takes nothing with him. Yet if man has sought the best course in life, his reward awaits him beyond the grave; there he finds the table set for a feast of joy that will last through eternity".

Meir's experience of the world was wide and varied, and the aggadah records several of his social maxims:

- Love the friend who admonishes thee and hate the one who flatters thee; for the former leads thee to life and the future world, while the latter puts thee out of the world." "Conciliate not thy friend in the hour of his passion; console him not when his dead is laid out before him; question him not in the hour of his vow; and strive to see him not in the hour of his disgrace".

Meir was fond of discoursing upon traveling:

- If you've entered a city, follow after its customs.
- "Travelers should go in threes, for a single traveler is likely to be murdered; two are likely to quarrel; but three will always make their way in peace".

== Tomb ==
Meir died in Assiya and was buried by the sea. Since at least 1210 CE, a certain "Rabbi Meir" has been described as buried by the Sea of Galilee, and today pilgrims visit a site near Tiberias in the view that it is the tanna Meir's tomb.

=== Assiya ===
According to the Jerusalem Talmud, Meir died in Assiya (Jewish Babylonian Aramaic: אסייא) and asked that his tomb be placed on the seashore. In another tannaitic narrative, "Rabbi Meir went to intercalate the year in Assiya and there was no scroll there written in ivrit, so he wrote one from memory and read from it". Other talmudic rabbis are also said to have intercalated the year in Assiya. From the context in the Jerusalem Talmud, it appears that Meir died outside the Land of Israel; similarly, his intercalation in Assiya must have been performed outside the Land of Israel. Zecharias Frankel and Heinrich Guggenheimer assume that this Assiya is Assos, while most translate it as Asia Minor. Others say it is Sardis, but this location is too far inland.

The Talmud also describes hot springs at an Assiya, although this may be a different location from Meir's, and cannot be the same as Hammat Tiberias, which the Talmud lists separately. One manuscript of b. Gittin f. 4b (Vat. 130) describes, "Rabbi Isaac said: There was a city named Assiya in the Land of Israel which had two hegemonies", but other manuscripts have the plural Assassiot, Assassaya, etc. In some manuscripts of Josephus, the word Gerasa is replaced by Essa, an unknown location; Epiphanius of Salamis mentions a spring (πηγή) at "Gerasa in Arabia Petraea" and refers to Gerasa in the plural; Origen suggests that the Gerasa of the Exorcism of the Gerasene demoniac is "Gergesa (Γέργεσα; probably Kursi) near Lake Tiberias"; Adolf Neubauer argues that talmudic Assiya, Josephus's Essa, and Origen's Gergesa are all the same location, which would place Meir's death-site by the Sea of Galilee, albeit on the opposite bank from the modern tomb. However, Essa is generally considered a scribal error.

=== Tomb by the Sea of Galilee ===
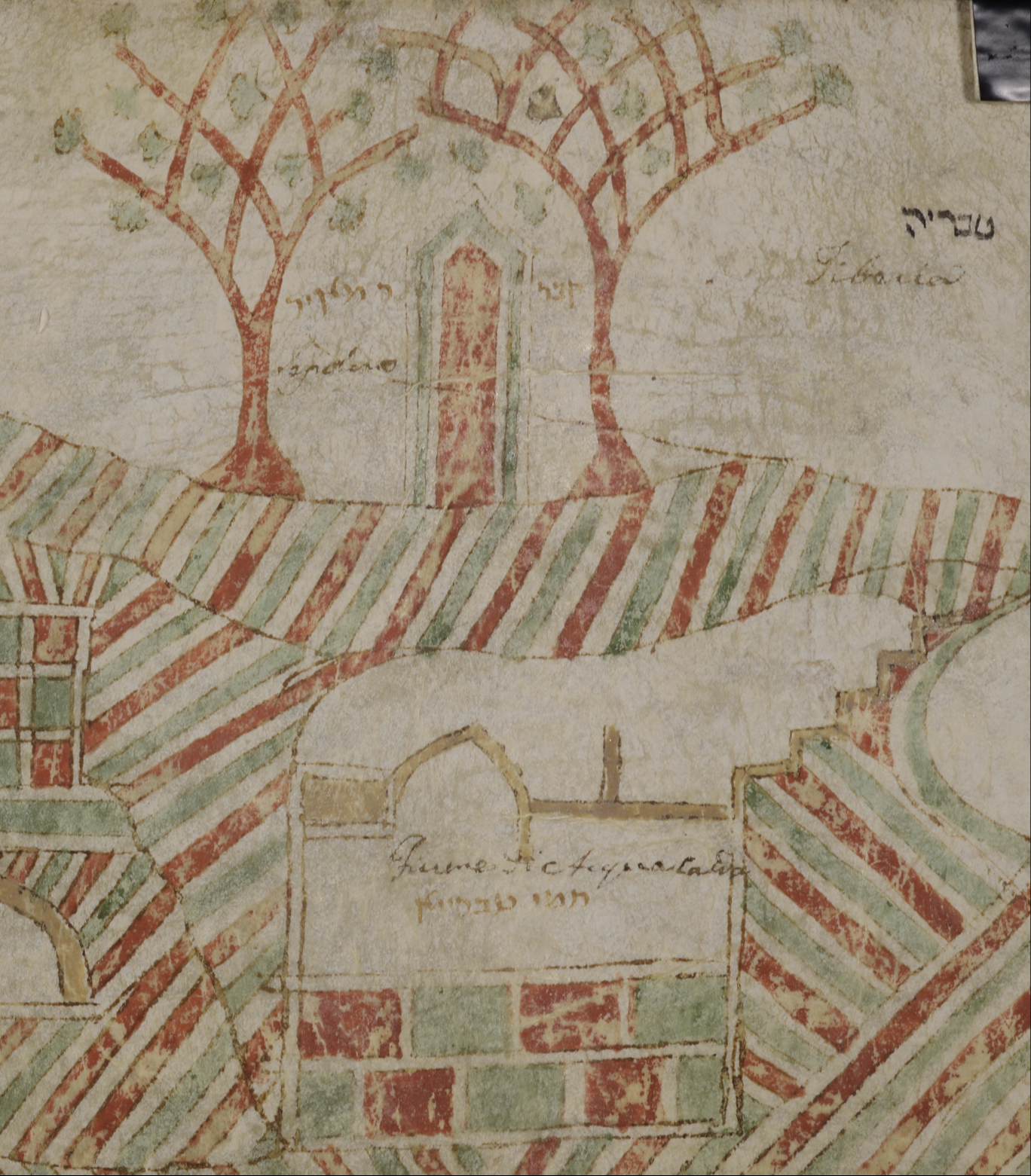
Tomb of "Rabbi Meir" over Hammat Tiberias in the "Florence Scroll", c. 1315

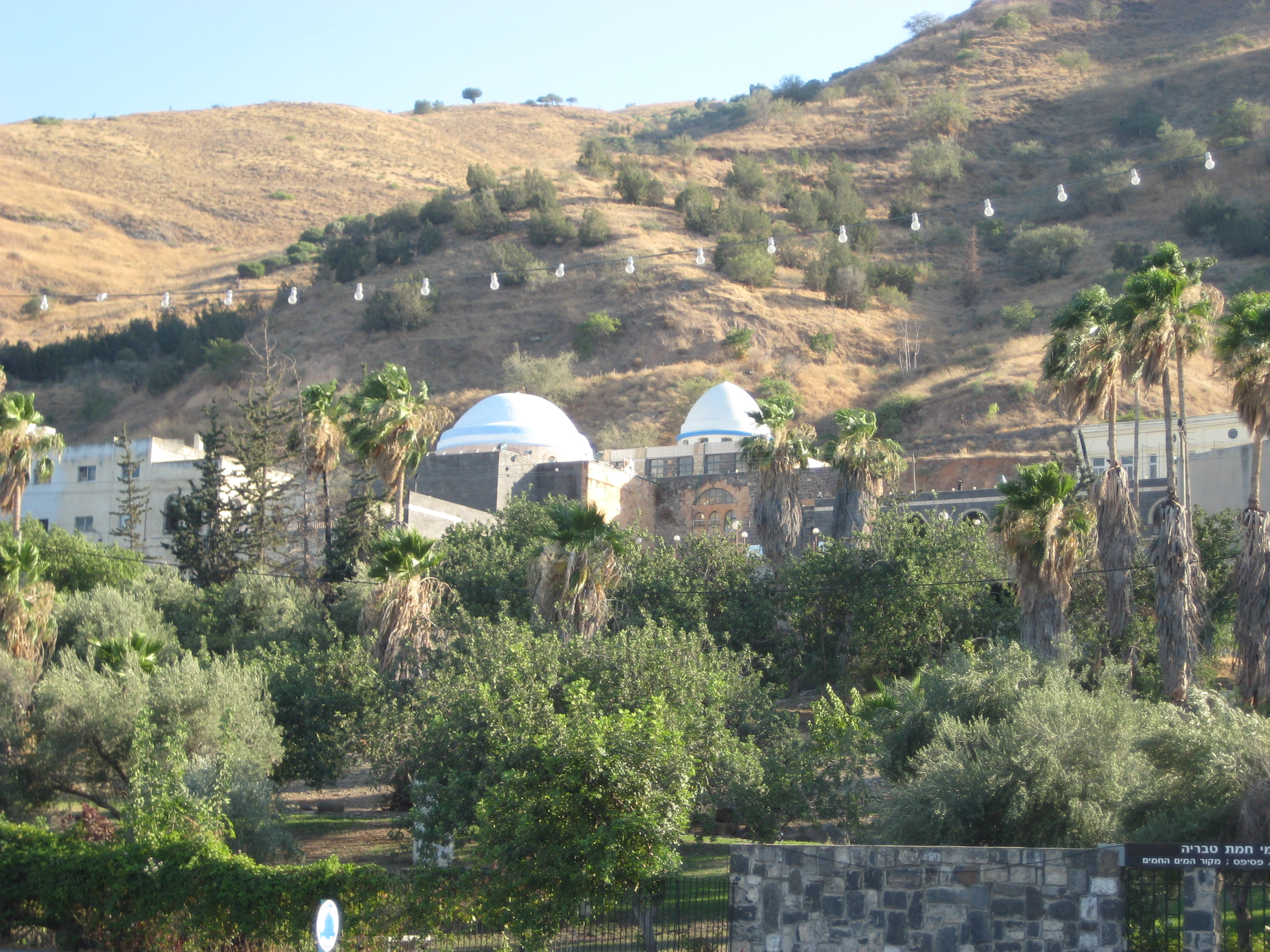
Modern tomb of "Meir", view from the Sea of Galilee

The tomb of a certain "Rabbi Meir" has been described as abutting the Sea of Galilee since at least 1210 CE, when Samuel ben Samson recorded that "Before we arrived in [Tiberias] we saw the tomb of Rabbi Meir". Samuel b. Samson also recorded the tomb of another Rabbi Meir, near Safed.

Jehiel of Paris (13th century) said that the tomb was that of the otherwise unknown "Meir Katzin", and the anonymous student of Nachmanides (14th) said that it was the tomb of the otherwise unknown "Meir Tatzun". Moses Bassola (16th) recorded that "Near [Tiberias], a grave marked by standing stones. They are always gathering to pray there, and they say that it is the grave of a certain Rabbi Meir who vowed never to sit down until the Messiah arrives, and he is buried standing up. He is not the Rabbi Meir of our Mishnah."

Nachmanides' well-known emigration to the region confused matters further, as his acronym RMBN was mistakenly associated with the occupant of the tomb and misinterpreted as Rabbi Meir Baal haNes ("Rabbi Meir of the Miracle"). The earliest known version of Yichus Avot, a 16th-century pilgrimage guide, says "Rabbi Jeremiah is buried standing up by the hot springs" (cf. y. Kilaim 9:3, Ketubot 12:3, Albeck's BRab p. 1286) and lists "Meir Baal haNes" as entombed at Gush Halav, but many later copies put Meir by the springs.

Nonetheless, some eventually began to claim that the tomb of "Meir" by the Sea of Galilee was in fact that of Rabbi Meir, the Tanna of the Mishnah. In this view, pilgrims visit the site to recite Tehillim and special prayers. A hillula is held in his honor on 14 Iyyar (Pesach Sheni); this date was originally selected for convenience, falling three days before Shimon ben Yochai's hillula (18 Iyyar), but it is now popularly believed to be his yahrzeit. Others light an extra lamp for Rabbi Meir on 1 Tevet (the sixth night of Hanukkah).

Charities have been named for "Meir of the Miracle", including Colel Chabad Rabbi Meir Ba'al HaNes' charity founded by Rabbi Schneur Zalman of Liadi in 1788, Kolel Ahavas Zion Siebenburgen founded in 1824, 'Rabbi Meir Baal HaNeis Salant' charity founded in 1860 by Rabbi Shmuel Salant and Kolel Chibas Yerushalayim/Meir Baal HaNess.

== See also ==
- Colel Chabad - The oldest Rabbi Meir Baal Haness Charity (Since 1788)
- RMBH Charities - Rabbi Meir Baal Haness Charity in the tradition dating to 1799
- Kupat Rabbi Meir Baal HaNes
- Kolel Chibas Yerushalayim
