= Eleazar ben Shammua =

2nd century rabbi and tanna

Eleazar ben Shammua or Eleazar I (Hebrew: אלעזר בן שמוע) was a rabbi of the 2nd century (4th generation of tannaim), frequently cited in rabbinic writings as simply Rabbi Eleazar (Bavli) or Rabbi Lazar רִבִּי לָֽעְזָר (Yerushalmi). He was of priestly descent and rich, and acquired great fame as a teacher of traditional law.

== Biography ==
Eleazar ben Shammua was a student of Rabbi Akiva, but was not ordained by him due to the Hadrianic persecution. After Akiva's death, however, Judah ben Bava ordained Eleazar, together with Rabbi Meir, Jose ben Halafta, Judah bar Ilai, and Shimon bar Yochai, at a secluded spot between Usha and Shefa-Amr. The ordainer was detected in the act and brutally slain, but the ordained escaped, and eventually became the custodians and disseminators of Jewish tradition.

Mention is made of a controversy between Eleazar and Rabbi Meir at Ardiska. He also maintained halakhic discussions with Judah bar Ilai and Jose ben Halafta, and quite frequently with Shimon bar Yoḥai; but he never appeared with them at the sessions of the Sanhedrin at Usha. Hence it may be assumed that he did not return to the scene of his ordination. Wherever he settled, he presided over an academy to which many students were attracted, including Joseph or Issi ha-Babli and Judah ha-Nasi. Thus, while his name does not appear in rabbinic lore as often as the names of his colleagues at the ordination, Eleazar had a significant influence on the development of the Talmud. Abba Arikha styles him "the most excellent among the sages", and Johanan bar Nappaha expresses unbounded admiration for his large-heartedness.

=== His nickname ===
The following story concerning Eleazar is twice told in the Midrashim: R. Eleazar visited a certain place where he was invited to lead the people in prayer, but he said he was unable to do so. "What!" cried the astonished people; "is this the celebrated R. Eleazar? Surely he deserves not to be called 'Rabbi'!" Eleazar's face colored with shame, and he returned to his teacher Rabbi Akiva. "Why are you so crestfallen?" inquired Akiva; whereupon Eleazar related his unpleasant experience. "Does my master wish to learn?" asked Akiva; and, on receiving Eleazar's affirmative answer, Akiva instructed him. Later, Eleazar again visited the scene of his embarrassment, and the people again requested that he lead them in prayer. This time he readily complied with their request, whereupon the people remarked, "R. Eleazar has become unmuzzled" (איטחסם, from חסם = "to muzzle"), and they called him "Eleazar Hasma".

The protagonist of this story is Eleazar ben Shammua, and not (as is often assumed) Eleazar Ḥisma. The latter was never Akiva's pupil. Indeed, he was Akiva's senior, and in the account of a halakhic discussion between him and Eleazar ben Azariah and Akiva, his name precedes that of Akiva. In contrast, Eleazar ben Shammua was an acknowledged disciple of Akiva, and the Midrashim explicitly state that he "went to Akiva, his teacher."

== Teachings ==
His disciples once requested that he tell them how he merited unusual longevity, when he replied, "I have never converted the Synagogue into a passageway [for the sake of convenience]; have never trodden over the heads of the holy people [i.e., come late to college and stepped between the rows of attentive students; compare Abdan], and have never pronounced the priestly blessing before offering the benediction preceding it." When asked what merits will save man from the tribulations which are to precede the Messianic epoch, he replied, "Let him engage in the study of the Law and in deeds of benevolence." According to Eleazar, children as well as pious adults share in the glory of God. He also taught that the world rests on a single pillar, the name of which is Righteousness, as the Bible says, "The righteous is the foundation of the world".

=== Quotes ===
- "Let the honor of your student be as dear to you as that of your colleague; that of your colleague, as the reverence of your master; and the reverence of your master, as that of the Most High."
- Even a fox, if it is his hour, bow down before him!
