= Judah ben Bava =

2nd century rabbi

Judah ben Bava was a rabbi in the 2nd century who ordained a number of rabbis at a time when the Roman government forbade this ceremony. The penalty was execution for the ordainer and the new rabbis. Rabbi Judah ben Bava was killed by Hadrian's soldiers at the age of seventy, and is known as one of the Ten Martyrs. Rabbi Judah ben Bava was caught by Hadrian's soldiers while ordaining his students Rabbi Meir, Rabbi Judah bar Ilai, R' Shimon bar Yochai, R' Jose ben Halafta, and R' Elazar ben Shamua in a place between Usha and Shefaram. He told his students to run, but he himself was too old. Hadrian's soldiers threw 300 javelins at him, causing his death.

== Contributions to Talmud ==
Judah ben Bava is the subject of many sayings and legends. He was known as "the Ḥasid," and it is said that wherever the Talmud speaks of "the Ḥasid", it is a reference either to him or to Judah ben Ilai.

He authored several decisions in the Halakha, including the ruling that one witness to the death of the husband is sufficient to justify permitting the wife to marry again. Rabbi Akiva was his most powerful opponent in halakhic disputes.
