= Rabbi Akiva =

Jewish scholar and sage (c. 50 – c. 135 CE)

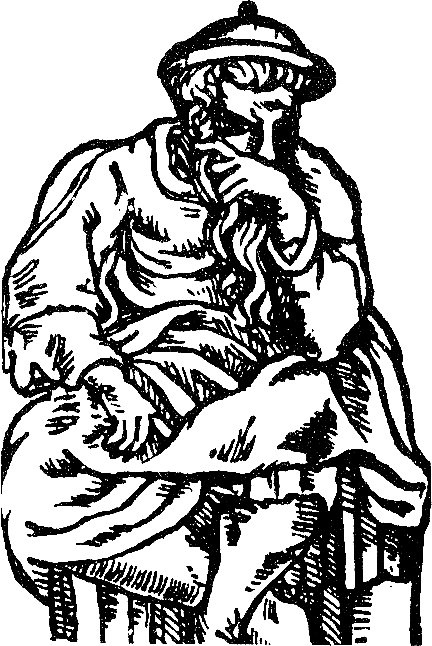
- 16th-century Haggadah illustration
- Title: Tanna

Personal life
- Born: Akiva ben Joseph c. 50 CE Lod, Judaea, Roman Empire
- Died: 28 September 135 Caesarea, Judaea, Roman Empire
- Buried: Tiberias, Galilee

Religious life
- Religion: Judaism

Akiva ben Joseph (Mishnaic Hebrew: עֲקִיבָא בֶּן יוֹסֵף, ʿĂqīḇāʾ ben Yōsēp̄; c. 50 – 28 September 135 CE), also known as Rabbi Akiva (רַבִּי עֲקִיבָא), was a leading Jewish scholar and sage and a tanna of the latter part of the first century and the beginning of the second. Rabbi Akiva was a member of the Sanhedrin that determined the final canon of the Hebrew bible and played a decisive part in the inclusion of both the Song of Songs and Ecclesiastes. This canon was later adopted by early Christian writers. He was a leading contributor to the Mishnah and to Midrash Halakha. He is referred to in Tosafot as Rosh la-Hakhamim ("Chief of the Sages"). He was executed by the Romans in the aftermath of the Bar Kokhba revolt. He has also been described as a philosopher.

== Biography ==
=== Early years ===
Akiva ben Joseph (written עֲקִיבָא in the Babylonian Talmud and עֲקִיבָה in the Jerusalem Talmud), born c. 50 CE, was of humble parentage. According to some sources, he was descended from converts to Judaism.

When Akiva married the daughter of Ben Kalba Sabuaʿ (בֶּן כַּלְבָּא שָׂבוּעַ), (Note: Meaning "son of the satisfied dog", an apparent reference to his generosity. According to the Mishnah tractate Yadayim, his real name was Joshua.) a wealthy citizen of Jerusalem, Akiva was an uneducated shepherd employed by him. The first name of Akiva's wife is not provided in earlier sources, but a later version of the tradition gives it as Rachel. She stood loyally by her husband during the period of his late initiation into rabbinic studies after he was 40 years of age, and in which Akiva dedicated himself to the study of Torah.

A different tradition narrates that, at the age of 40, Akiva attended the academy of his native town, Lod, presided over by Eliezer ben Hurcanus. Hurcanus was a neighbour of Joseph, the father of Akiva. The fact that Eliezer was his first teacher, and the only one whom Akiva later designates as "rabbi", is of importance in settling the date of Akiva's birth. These legends set the beginning of his years of study at about 75–80.

Besides Eliezer, Akiva studied under Joshua ben Hananiah and Nachum Ish Gamzu. According to the Jerusalem Talmud, R. Joshua ordained Akiva as his fellow-student, presumably with semikhah. Akiva was on equal footing with Gamaliel II, whom he later met. Rabbi Tarfon was considered as one of Akiva's masters, but the pupil outranked his teacher and he became one of Akiva's greatest admirers. Akiva remained in Lod as long as Eliezer dwelt there, and then moved his own school to Beneberak. Akiva also lived for some time at Ziphron, modern Zafran near Hamath.

=== Marriage ===
According to the Talmud, Akiva was a shepherd for Ben Kalba Sabuaʿ when the latter's daughter noticed his modesty and fine character traits. She offered to marry him if he would agree to begin studying Torah, as at the time he was 40 years old and illiterate. When her father found out she was secretly betrothed to an unlearned man, he was furious. He drove his daughter out of his house, swearing that he would never help her while Akiva remained her husband. Akiva and his wife lived in such poverty that they used straw for their bed. The Talmud relates that once Elijah the prophet assumed the guise of a poor man and came to their door to beg for some straw for a bed for his wife after she had given birth. When Akiva and his wife saw that there were people even poorer than they, Rachel said to him, "Go, and become a scholar".

By agreement with his wife, Akiva spent twelve years away from home, pursuing his studies. He would make a living by cutting wood from the forest, selling half for his wife's and children's wellbeing, and using the other half for keeping a fire burning at night to keep himself warm and to provide light thereby for his own studies. Returning at the end of twelve years accompanied by 12,000 disciples, at the point of entering his home he overheard his wife say to a neighbour who was critical of his long absence: "If I had my wish, he should stay another twelve years at the academy." Without crossing the threshold, Akiva went back to the academy. He returned twelve years later escorted by 24,000 disciples. When his wife went out to greet him, some of his students, not knowing who she was, sought to restrain her. But Akiva exclaimed, "Let her alone; for what is mine and yours, is hers" (she deserves the credit for our Torah study). Not knowing who he was, Ben Kalba Sabuaʿ also approached Akiva and asked him for help annulling his vow to disown his daughter and her husband. Akiva asked him, "Would you have made your vow if you had known that he would become a great scholar?" Ben Kalba Sabuaʿ replied, "Had I known that he would learn even one chapter or one single Halakha, [I would not have made the vow]". Akiva said to him, "I am that man". Ben Kalba Sabuaʿ fell at Akiva's feet and gave him half his wealth.

According to another source, Akiva saw that at some future time he would take in marriage the wife of Turnus Rufus (his executioner, also known as Quintus Tineius Rufus) after she converted to Judaism, for which reason he spat on the ground (for having come from a fetid drop), smiled (at her conversion) and wept (at such beauty eventually rotting in the dust after death). The motive behind this marriage is not given.

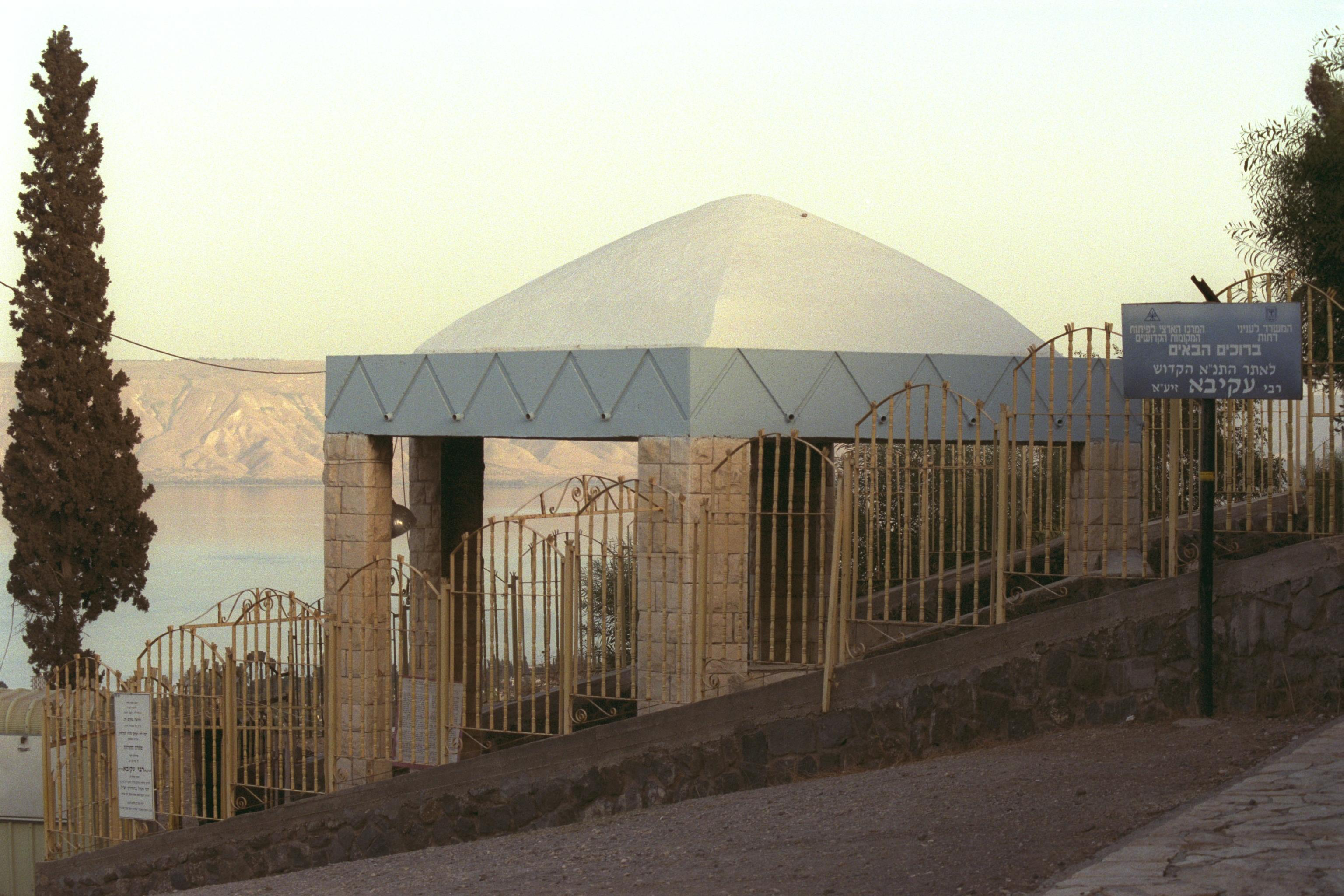
Modern-day site of Rabbi Akiva's tomb, Tiberias

=== Later years ===
The greatest tannaim of the middle of the second century came from Akiva's school, notably Rabbi Meir, Judah bar Ilai, Simeon bar Yochai, Jose ben Halafta, Eleazar ben Shammua, and Rabbi Nehemiah. Besides these, Akiva had many disciples whose names have not been handed down, but the Aggadah variously gives their number as 12,000, 24,000 and 48,000.

Akiva is reported to have had a rabbinic relationship with Rabban Gamaliel dated as before their trip to Rome. Convinced of the necessity of a central authority for Judaism, Akiva became a devoted adherent and friend of Rabban Gamaliel, who aimed at constituting the patriarch the true spiritual chief of the Jews. However, Akiva was just as firmly convinced that the power of the patriarch must be limited both by the written and the oral law, the interpretation of which lay in the hands of the learned; and he was accordingly brave enough to act in ritual matters in Rabban Gamaliel's own house contrary to the decisions of Rabban Gamaliel himself. Akiva filled the office of an overseer of the poor. Various rabbinic texts testify to his personal qualities, such as benevolence and kindness toward the sick and needy.

In 95–96 CE, Akiva was in Rome, and some time before 110 he was in Nehardea. During his travels, it is probable that he visited other places having important Jewish communities.

Akiva allegedly took part in the Bar Kokhba revolt of 132–136, but his role here is not historically determined. The only established fact concerning Akiva's connection with Bar Kochba is that he regarded Bar Kochba as the promised Messiah; this is the only evidence of active participation by Akiva in the revolution. Some modern scholars argue that Akiva's thousands of students died fighting for Bar Kochba, but this opinion was first formulated by Nachman Krochmal around 200 years ago and has no earlier source. A baraita states that Akiva suffered martyrdom on account of his transgression of Hadrian's edicts against the practice and the teaching of the Jewish religion, being sentenced to die by Turnus Rufus in Caesarea. As this story credits the execution to religious rather than political reasons, it may be evidence against Akiva's having a role in the revolt. Akiva's death occurred after several years of imprisonment, which places it at about 132, before the suppression of the Bar Kochba revolution; otherwise the delay of the Romans in executing him would be quite inexplicable. That the religious interdicts of Hadrian preceded the overthrow of Bar Kochba is shown by the Mekhilta.

Jewish sources relate that he was subjected to combing, a Roman torture in which the victim's skin was flayed with iron combs.

=== Death ===
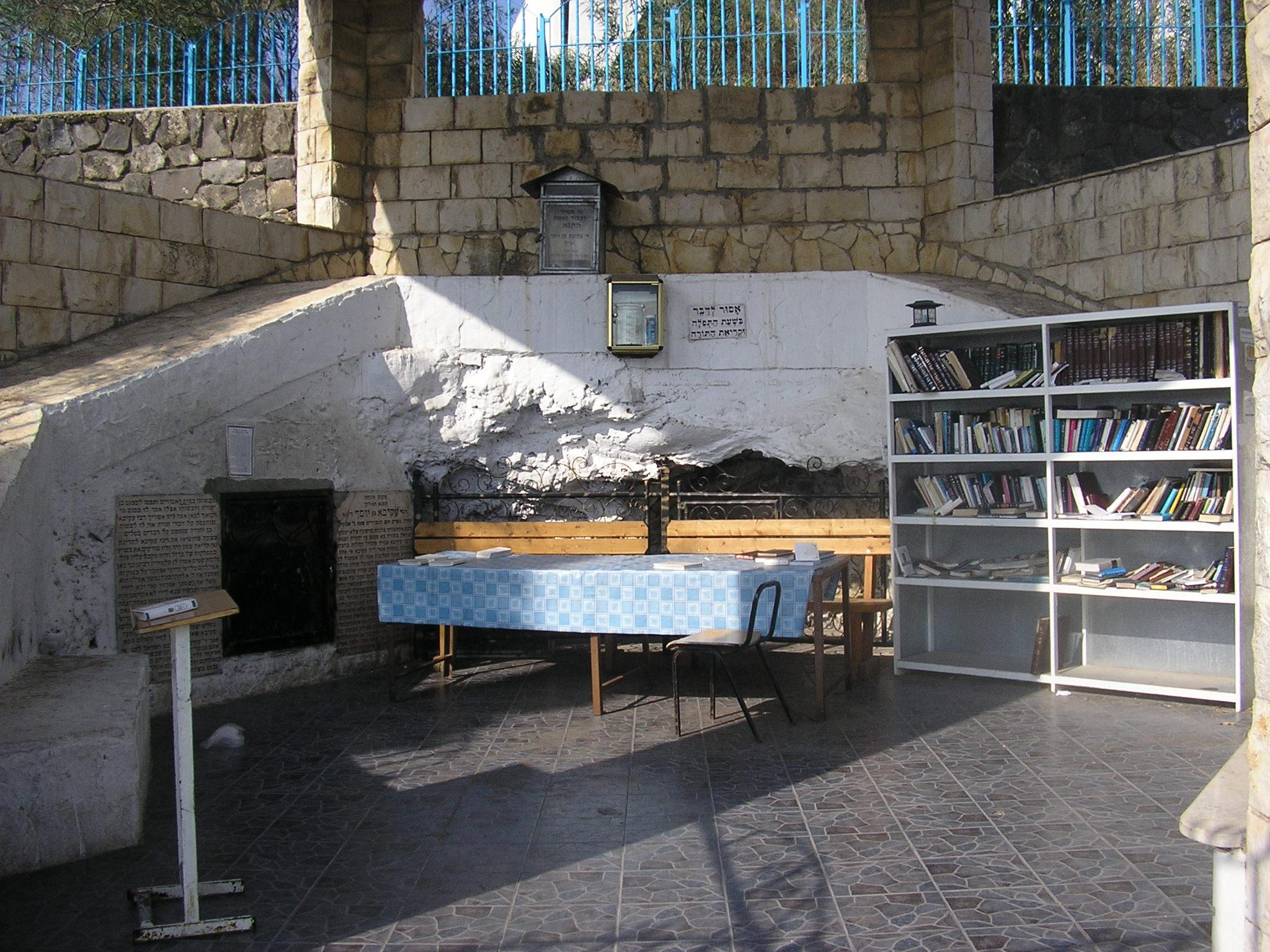
Akiva's grave in Tiberias

The death of Akiva is usually rendered as some redacted form of three separate versions of the circumstances. Each version shares the same basic plot points: Akiva defies the Roman prohibition on teaching Torah, the consul Turnus Rufus orders his execution, Akiva is flayed alive, and his final words are the Shema prayer.

The most common version of Akiva's death is that the Roman government ordered him to stop teaching Torah, on pain of death, and that he refused. When Turnus Rufus, as he is called in Jewish sources, ordered Akiva's execution, Akiva is said to have recited his prayers calmly, though suffering agonies; and when Rufus asked him whether he was a sorcerer, since he felt no pain, Akiva replied, "I am no sorcerer; but I rejoice at the opportunity now given to me to love my God 'with all my life,' seeing that I have hitherto been able to love Him only 'with all my means' and 'with all my might.'" He began reciting the Shema, and with the word Echad, "[God is] One!", he expired.

The version in the Babylonian Talmud tells it as a response of Akiva to his students, who asked him how he could yet offer prayers to God. He says to them, "All my life I was worried about the verse, 'with all your soul' (and the sages expounded this to signify), even if He takes away your soul. And I said to myself, when will I ever be able to fulfil this command? And now that I am finally able to fulfil it, I should not?" Then he said the Shema and he extended the final word Echad ("One") until his life expired with that word. A heavenly voice went out and announced: "Blessed are you, Rabbi Akiva, that your life expired with Echad".

Another legend is that Elijah bore the body by night to Caesarea. The night, however, was as bright as the finest summer's day. When they arrived, Elijah and Joshua entered a cavern that contained a bed, table, chair, and lamp, and deposited Akiva's body there. No sooner had they left it than the cavern closed of its own accord, so that no one has found it since. Rabbi Akiva's modern day tomb is located in Tiberias. Annually, on the night of Lag BaOmer, pilgrims light bonfires at the tomb of Rabbi Akiva. The pilgrims include some from Boston, Massachusetts, a tradition reinstated by the Bostoner Rebbe in 1983.

== Religious and scholarly perspectives ==
=== Religious philosophy ===
A Tannaitic tradition mentions that of the four who delved into the Pardes (legend), Akiva was the only one who was able to properly absorb this wisdom, with the other three suffering various consequences as a result of the attempt. This serves at least to show how strong in later ages was the recollection of Akiva's philosophical speculation.

As to the creation of man and his actions, Akiva would say: "All things are foreseen [by God], yet the freedom to choose is given [unto man], and the world is judged on [its] merits, while everything is according to the preponderance of [good or bad] works." – Mishnah (Avot 3:18)

==== The relationship between God and man ====
Akiva's opinion about the very creation of man is recorded in Pirkei Avot:

How favoured is man, for he was created after an image; as Scripture says, "for in an image, God made man."

Akiva's ontology is based upon the principle that man was created בצלם, that is, not in the image of God—which would be בצלם אלהים—but after an image, after a primordial type; or, philosophically speaking, after an Idea—what Philo calls in agreement with Judean theology, "the first heavenly man" (see Adam ḳadmon). Strict monotheist that Akiva was, he protested against any comparison of God with the angels, and declared the plain interpretation of כאחד ממנו as meaning "like one of us" to be arrant blasphemy. It is quite instructive to read how a Christian of Akiva's generation, Justin Martyr, calls the literal interpretation—thus objected to by Akiva—a "Jewish heretical one". In his earnest endeavours to insist as strongly as possible upon the incomparable nature of God, Akiva indeed lowers the angels somewhat to the realms of mortals, and (alluding to Psalms 78:25) maintains that manna is the actual food of the angels. This view of Akiva's, in spite of the energetic protests of his colleague Rabbi Ishmael, became the one generally accepted by his contemporaries.

From his views as to the relation between God and man, he deduces that a murderer is to be considered as committing the crime against the divine archetype (דמות) of man. Similarly, he recognizes as the chief and greatest principle of Judaism the command, "Thou shalt love thy neighbour as thyself." He does not, indeed, maintain thereby that the execution of this command is equivalent to the performance of the whole Law; and in one of his polemic interpretations of Scripture he protests strongly against a contrary opinion allegedly held by Christians, and other non-Jews since the diaspora, according to which Judaism is at best "simply morality." For, in spite of his philosophy, Akiva was an extremely strict and national Jew.

But he is far from representing strict justice as the only attribute of God: in agreement with the ancient Israel theology of the מדת הדין, "the attribute of justice", and מדת הרחמים, "the attribute of mercy," he teaches that God combines goodness and mercy with strict justice. Hence his maxim, referred to above, "God rules the world in mercy, but according to the preponderance of good or bad in human acts."

=== Eschatology ===
As to the question concerning the frequent sufferings of the pious and the prosperity of the wicked—truly a burning one in Akiva's time—this is answered by the explanation that the pious are punished in this life for their few sins, so that in the next they may receive only reward; while the wicked obtain in this world all the recompense for the little good they have done, and in the next world will receive only punishment for their misdeeds. Consistent as Akiva always was, his ethics and his views of justice were only the strict consequences of his philosophical system. Justice as an attribute of God must also be exemplary for man. "No mercy in [civil] justice!" is his basic principle in the doctrine concerning law, and he does not conceal his opinion that the action of the Jews in taking the spoil of the Egyptians is to be condemned.

=== Biblical canon ===
Akiva was instrumental in drawing up the canon of the Tanakh. He protested strongly against the canonicity of certain of the Apocrypha, the Wisdom of Sirach, for instance, in which passages קורא is to be explained according to Kiddushin 49a, and חיצונים according to its Aramaic equivalent ברייתא; so that Akiva's utterance reads, "He who reads aloud in the synagogue from books not belonging to the canon as if they were canonical," etc. But he was not opposed to a private reading of the Apocrypha, as is evident from the fact that he himself makes frequent use of Sirach. Akiva stoutly defended, however, the canonicity of the Song of Songs, and Esther. Grätz's statements respecting Akiva's attitude toward the canonicity of the Song of Songs were viewed as misconceptions by I.H. Weiss.

Aquila, meanwhile, was a disciple of Akiva and, under Akiva's guidance, gave the Greek-speaking Jews a rabbinical Bible. Akiva probably also provided for a revised text of the Targums; certainly, for the essential base of the Targum Onkelos, which in matters of Halakha reflects Akiva's opinions completely.

=== Akiva as systematizer ===
Akiva worked in the domain of the Halakha, both in the systematization of its traditional material and in its further development. The condition of the Halakha, that is, of religious praxis, and indeed of Judaism in general, was a very precarious one at the turn of the 1st century of the common era. The lack of any systematized collection of the accumulated halachot rendered impossible any presentation of them in a form suitable for practical purposes. Means for the theoretical study of the Halakha were also scant; both logic and exegesis—the two props of the Halakha—being differently conceived by the various rulings Tannaim, and differently taught. According to a tradition (which has historical confirmation), it was Akiva who systematized and arranged the "Mishna" (the halakhic codex); the "midrash" (the exegesis of the Halkha), and the "halachot" (the logical amplification of the Halakha). The Mishna of Akiva, as his pupil Rabbi Meir had taken it from him, became the basis of the Six Orders of the Mishna.

The δευτερώσεις τοῦ καλουμένου Ραββὶ Ακιβά (Mishnah of the one called "Rabbi Akiva") mentioned by Epiphanius, as well as the "great Mishnayot of Akiva", are probably not to be understood as independent Mishnayot (δευτερώσεις) existing at that time, but as the teachings and opinions of Akiva contained in the officially recognized Mishnayot and Midrashim. At the same time, it is fair to consider the Mishnah of Judah ha-Nasi (called simply "the Mishnah"), as well as the majority of all halakhic Midrashim now extant, as derived from the school of Akiva.

According to Joḥanan bar Nappaḥa (199–279), "Our Mishnah comes directly from Rabbi Meir, the Tosefta from R. Nehemiah, the Sifra from R. Judah, and the Sifre from R. Simon; but they all took Akiva for a model in their works and followed him." One recognizes here the threefold division of the halakhic material that emanated from Akiva: (1) The codified halakhah (i.e. Mishnah); (2) the Tosefta, which in its original form contains a concise logical argument for the Mishnah, somewhat like the Lebush of Mordecai Jafe on the Shulchan Aruch; (3) the halakhic Midrash.

The following halakhic Midrashim originating in Akiva's school: the Mekhilta of Rabbi Shimon on Exodus; Sifra on Leviticus; Sifre Zuṭṭa on Numbers; and the Sifre to Deuteronomy, the halakhic portion of which belongs to Akiva's school.

What was Rabbi Akiva like? - A worker who goes out with his basket. He finds wheat – he puts it in, barley – he puts it in, spelt – he puts it in, beans – he puts it in, lentils – he puts it in. When he arrives home he sorts out the wheat by itself, barley by itself, spelt by itself, beans by themselves, lentils by themselves. So did Rabbi Akiva; he arranged the Torah rings by rings.

=== Akiva's Halakha ===
Akiva was responsible not only for systematization of the Halakha, but also for hermeneutics and halakhic exegesis, which form the foundation of all Talmudic learning.

The enormous difference between the Halakha before and after Akiva may be briefly described as follows: The old Halakha was (as its name indicates) the religious practice sanctioned as binding by tradition, to which were added extensions and (in some cases) limitations of the Torah, arrived at by strict logical deduction. The opposition offered by the Sadducees (which became especially strenuous in the first century BC) led to the development of the halakhic midrash, whose purpose was to deduce these amplifications of the Law, by tradition and logic, out of the Law itself.

It might be thought that with the destruction of the Temple in Jerusalem—which event made an end of Sadduceeism—the halakhic Midrash would also have disappeared, seeing that the Halakha could now dispense with the Midrash. This likely would have been the case had not Akiva created his own Midrash, by means of which he was able "to discover things that were even unknown to Moses." Akiva made the accumulated treasure of the oral law—which until his time was only a subject of knowledge, and not a science—an inexhaustible mine from which, by the means he provided, new treasures might be continually extracted.

If the older Halakha is to be considered as the product of the internal struggle between Phariseeism and Sadduceeism, the Halakha of Akiva has been viewed as the result of an external contest between Judaism on the one hand and Hellenism and Hellenistic Christianity on the other. Akiva no doubt perceived that the intellectual bond uniting the Jews—far from being allowed to disappear with the destruction of the Jewish state—must be made to draw them closer together than before. He pondered also the nature of that bond. The Bible could never again fill the place alone; for the Christians also regarded it as a divine revelation. Still less could dogma serve the purpose, for dogmas were always repellent to rabbinical Judaism, whose very essence is development and the susceptibility to development. Mention has already been made of the fact that Akiva was the creator of a rabbinical Bible version elaborated with the aid of his pupil, Aquila (though this is traditionally debated), and designed to become the common property of all Jews.

But this was not sufficient to obviate all threatening danger. It was to be feared that the Jews, by their facility in accommodating themselves to surrounding —even then a marked characteristic—might become entangled in the net of Grecian philosophy, and even in that of Gnosticism. The example of his colleagues and friends, Elisha ben Abuyah, Ben Azzai, and Ben Zoma strengthened him still more in his conviction of the necessity of providing some counterpoise to the intellectual influence of the non-Jewish world.

=== Akiva's hermeneutic system ===
Akiva sought to apply the system of isolation followed by the Pharisees (פרושים = those who "separate" themselves) to doctrine as they did to practice, to the intellectual life as they did to that of daily discourse, and he succeeded in furnishing a firm foundation for his system. As the fundamental principle of his system, Akiva enunciates his conviction that the mode of expression used by the Torah is quite different from that of every other book. In the language of the Torah nothing is mere form; everything is essence. It has nothing superfluous; not a word, not a syllable, not even a letter. Every peculiarity of diction, every particle, every sign, is to be considered as of higher importance, as having a wider relation and as being of deeper meaning than it seems to have. Like Philo, who saw in the Hebrew construction of the infinitive with the finite form of the same verb and in certain particles (adverbs, prepositions, etc.) some deep reference to philosophical and ethical doctrines, Akiva perceived in them indications of many important ceremonial laws, legal statutes, and ethical teachings.

He thus gave the Jewish mind not only a new field for its own employment, but, convinced both of the immutability of Holy Scripture and of the necessity for development in Judaism, he succeeded in reconciling these two apparently hopeless opposites by means of his remarkable method. The following two illustrations will serve to make this clear:

- The high conception of woman's dignity, which Akiva shared in common with most other Pharisees, induced him to abolish the folk custom that banished ritually impure women from all social communication. He succeeded, moreover, in fully justifying his interpretation of those Scriptural passages upon which this ostracism could be incorrectly sourced.
- For him a "Jewish slave" is a contradiction in terms, for every Jew is to be regarded as a prince. Akiva therefore teaches, in opposition to the competing halakhah, that the sale of an underage daughter by her father conveys to her purchaser no legal title to marriage with her, but, on the contrary, carries with it the duty to keep the female slave until she is of age, and then to marry her. How Akiva endeavours to substantiate this from the Hebrew text is shown.

His hermeneutics frequently put him at odds with the interpretation of his colleagues, as particularly demonstrated by his attitude toward the Samaritans. He considered friendly discussion with these potential converts as desirable on political as well as on religious grounds, and he permitted not only eating their bread, but also intermarriage, considering them as full converts. This is quite remarkable, seeing that in matrimonial legislation he went so far as to declare every forbidden betrothal as absolutely void and the offspring as illegitimate. For similar reasons, Akiva rules leniently in the Biblical ordinance of Kil'ayim; nearly every chapter in the treatise of that name contains a mitigation by Akiva.

Love for the Holy Land, which he as a genuine nationalist frequently and warmly expressed, was so powerful with him that he would have exempted agriculture from much of the rigour of the Law. These examples will suffice to justify the opinion that Akiva was the man to whom Judaism owes pre-eminently its activity and its capacity for further development in accordance with the tradition he received.

== Selected legends ==
In a Talmudic sugya, Rav Yehudah narrates the story when Moses sees Rabbi Akiva (Menachot 29b). In this legend, Moses ascended to heaven (or Mount Sinai) and saw God preoccupied with making ornamental "crowns" for the letters of the Torah. When Moses inquired what the purpose of these embellishments were, God explained that a man named Akiva would be born in several generations, and that he would be able to deduce halakha from every little curve and crown of the letters of the Law. Moses requested that he be allowed to see this man, and God assented: Moses found himself sitting in Akiva's study hall. As Moses listened to Akiva's lesson, he grew weary, because he could not understand it. However, when one of the students asked Akiva for the source of his teaching, Akiva replied that it was "A law to Moses at Sinai", and Moses was put at ease. When Moses returns to God and asks what the pious Akiva's ultimate reward will be, he is shown the grisly aftermath of Akiva's execution. Horrified, Moses demands God explain His actions, at which point God commands Moses to be silent and respect His judgement. According to Louis Ginzberg, "this story gives in naïve style a picture of Akiba's activity as the father of Talmudical Judaism."

Tinnius Rufus asked: "Which is the more beautiful—God's work or man's?" Akiva replied: "Undoubtedly man's work is the better, for while nature at God's command supplies us only with the raw material, human skill enables us to elaborate the same according to the requirements of art and good taste." Rufus had hoped to drive Akiva into a corner by his strange question; for he expected quite a different answer and intended to compel Akiva to admit the wickedness of circumcision. He then put the question, "Why has God not made man just as He wanted him to be?" Akiva had an answer ready: "For the very reason, man must perfect himself."

The aggadah explains how Akiva, in the prime of life, commenced his rabbinical studies. Legendary allusion to this change in Akiva's life is made in two slightly varying forms. Likely the older of the two goes as follows: "Akiva, noticing a stone at a well that had been hollowed out by drippings from the buckets, said: If these drippings can, by continuous action, penetrate this solid stone, how much more can the persistent word of God penetrate the pliant, fleshly human heart, if that word but be presented with patient insistency."

Akiva taught thousands of students: on one occasion, twenty-four thousand students of his died in a plague. His five main students were Judah bar Ilai, Rabbi Meir, Rabbi Eleazar ben Shammua, Jose ben Halafta and Shimon bar Yochai.

Once he was called upon to decide between a dark-skinned king and the king's wife; the wife having been accused of infidelity after bearing a white child. Akiva ascertained that the royal chamber was adorned with white marble statuary, and, based on the theory that a child is similar in nature to whatever its parents gazed upon while conceiving the child, he exonerated the queen from suspicion. It is related that, during his stay in Rome, Akiva became intimately acquainted with the Jewish proselyte Ketia bar Shalom, a very influential Roman (according to some scholars identical with Flavius Clemens, Domitian's nephew), who, before his execution for pleading the cause of the Jews, bequeathed to Akiva all his possessions.

The Talmud enumerates six occasions in which Akiva gained wealth. In one case, his success as a teacher led his wealthy father-in-law Kalba Savua to acknowledge such a distinguished son-in-law and to support him. Another source of his wealth was said to be a large sum of money borrowed from a heathen woman, a matrona. As bondsmen for the loan, Akiva named God and the sea, on the shore of which the matrona's house stood. Akiva, being sick, could not return the money at the time appointed; but his bondsmen did not leave him in the lurch. An imperial princess suddenly became insane, in which condition she threw a chest containing imperial treasures into the sea. It was cast upon the shore close to the house of Akiva's creditor, so that when the matrona went to the shore to demand of the sea the amount she had lent Akiva, the ebbing tide left boundless riches at her feet. Later, when Akiva arrived to discharge his indebtedness, the matrona not only refused to accept the money, but insisted upon Akiva's receiving a large share of what the sea had brought to her.

This was not the only occasion on which Akiva was made to feel the truth of his favourite maxim ("Whatever God does, He does for the best"). Once, being unable to find any sleeping accommodation in a certain city, he was compelled to pass the night outside its walls. Without a murmur he resigned himself to this hardship; and even when a lion devoured his donkey, and a cat killed the rooster whose crowing was to herald the dawn to him, and the wind extinguished his candle, the only remark he made was, "All that God does is for the good." When morning dawned he learned how true his words were. A band of robbers had fallen upon the city and carried its inhabitants into captivity, but he had escaped because his abiding place had not been noticed in the darkness, and neither beast nor fowl had betrayed him.

Another legend according to which the gates of the infernal regions opened for Akiva is analogous to the more familiar tale that he entered paradise and was allowed to leave it unscathed. There exists the following tradition: Akiva once met a coal-black man carrying a heavy load of wood and running with the speed of a horse. Akiva stopped him and inquired: "My son, why do you work so hard? If you are a slave and have a harsh master, I will buy you from him. If it be out of poverty that you do this, I will take care of your needs." "It is for neither of these," the man replied; "I am dead and am compelled because of my great sins to build my funeral pyre every day. In life, I was a tax-gatherer and oppressed the poor. Let me go at once, lest the demon tortures me for my delay." "Is there no help for you?" asked Akiva. "Almost none," replied the deceased; "for I understand that my sufferings will end only when I have a pious son. When I died, my wife was pregnant; but I have little hope that she will give my child proper training." Akiva inquired about the man's name and that of his wife and her dwelling place. When, in the course of his travels, he reached the place, Akiva sought information concerning the man's family. The neighbours very freely expressed their opinion that the deceased and his wife deserved to inhabit the infernal regions for all time—the latter because she had not even performed brit milah for the child. Akiva, however, was not to be turned from his purpose; he sought the son of the tax-gatherer and laboured long and assiduously in teaching him the word of God. After fasting for 40 days and praying to God to bless his efforts, he heard a heavenly voice (bat kol) asking, "Why do you go to so much trouble on behalf of this person?" "Because he is just the kind to work for," was the prompt answer. Akiva persevered until his pupil was able to officiate as a reader in the synagogue; and when there for the first time he recited the prayer, "Bless the Lord!" the father suddenly appeared to Akiva and overwhelmed him with thanks for his deliverance from the pains of hell through the merit of his son. This legend has been somewhat elaborately treated in Yiddish. Another version of this story exists in which Johanan ben Zakkai's name is given in place of Akiva.

== In popular culture ==
Historical novels available in English which feature Akiva as a main character include:

- Akiba [German] by Marcus Lehmann (1880), translated into Hebrew (Rothblum 1896) and English (Schaffer 1925, Leftwich 1956, Zucker 2003)
- The Son of a Star by Benjamin Ward Richardson (1888).
- Festival at Meron by Harry Sackler (1935)
- As a Driven Leaf by Milton Steinberg (1939)
- The Last Revolt [Yiddish] by Joseph Opatoshu (1948), translated into Hebrew (Ben-Israel 1948) and English (Spiegel 1952)
- Prince of Israel by Elias Gilner (1952)
- The Soldier and the Sage by Richard Gibson Hubler (1966)
- Son of a Star by Andrew Meisels (1969)
- If I Forget Thee by Brenda L. Segal (1985)
- Four Who Entered Paradise by Howard Schwartz (1995)
- My Husband, Bar Kokhba by Andrew Sanders (2003)
- The Orchard [Hebrew] by Yochi Brandes (2012), translated into English by Daniel Libenson (2018)

According to Barry W. Holtz, "It is no accident that Akiva has inspired works of fiction—not only because of his importance in Jewish religious history, but also because of the simple fact that so many of the details of his life are unknown and therefore grist for the mill of a novelist."

== See also ==
- Rabbinic stance on Bar Kokhba revolt

== Sources ==
- Rothenberg, Naftali, Rabbi Akiva's Philosophy of Love, New York, Palgrave-Macmillan, 2017.
- Aleksandrov, G. S. "The Role of Aqiba in the Bar Kochba Rebellion." In Eliezer ben Hyrcanus, Vol. 2, by Jacob Neusner. Leiden, Netherlands: E.J. Brill, 1973.
- Finkelstein, Louis. Akiba: Scholar, Saint, and Martyr. New York: Covici, Friede, 1936.
- Ginzberg, Louis. "Akiba" In Jewish Encyclopedia, vol. 1. New York: Funk and Wagnalls, 1912.
- Goldin, Judah. "Toward a Profile of a Tanna, Aqiba ben Joseph." Journal of the American Oriental Society 96 (1976): 38–56.
- Lau, Binyamin. The Sages, Volume III: The Galilean Period. Jerusalem: Maggid Books, 2013.
- Neusner, Jacob, ed. Studies in Judaism in Late Antiquity. Vol. 20, The Jews Under Roman Rule: From Pompey to Diocletian, by E. Mary Smallwood. Leiden, Netherlands: E. J. Brill, 1976.
