= History of Jewish mysticism =

The history of Jewish mysticism encompasses various forms of esoteric and spiritual practices aimed at understanding the divine and the hidden aspects of existence. This mystical tradition has evolved significantly over millennia, influencing and being influenced by different historical, cultural, and religious contexts. Among the most prominent forms of Jewish mysticism is Kabbalah, which emerged in the 12th century and has since become a central component of Jewish mystical thought. Other notable early forms include prophetic and apocalyptic mysticism, which are evident in biblical and post-biblical texts.

The roots of Jewish mysticism can be traced back to the biblical era, with prophetic figures such as Elijah and Ezekiel experiencing divine visions and encounters. This tradition continued into the apocalyptic period, where texts like 1 Enoch and the Book of Daniel introduced complex angelology and eschatological themes. The Heikhalot and Merkavah literature, dating from the 2nd century to the early medieval period, further developed these mystical themes, focusing on visionary ascents to the heavenly palaces and the divine chariot.

The medieval period saw the formalization of Kabbalah, particularly in Southern France and Spain. Foundational texts such as the Bahir and the Zohar were composed during this time, laying the groundwork for later developments. The Kabbalistic teachings of this era delved deeply into the nature of the divine, the structure of the universe, and the process of creation. Notable Kabbalists like Moses de León played crucial roles in disseminating these teachings, which were characterized by their profound symbolic and allegorical interpretations of the Torah.

In the early modern period, Lurianic Kabbalah, founded by Isaac Luria in the 16th century, introduced new metaphysical concepts such as Tzimtzum (divine contraction) and Tikkun (cosmic repair), which have had a lasting impact on Jewish thought. The 18th century saw the rise of Hasidism, a movement that integrated Kabbalistic ideas into a popular, revivalist context, emphasizing personal mystical experience and the presence of the divine in everyday life. Today, the academic study of Jewish mysticism, pioneered by scholars like Gershom Scholem, continues to explore its historical, textual, and philosophical dimensions.

== Origins ==
According to the traditional Kabbalistic understanding, Kabbalah dates from Eden. It came down from a remote past as a revelation to elect tzadikim (righteous people), and, for the most part, was preserved only by a privileged few. Talmudic Judaism records its view of the proper protocol for teaching secrets in the Talmud, Tractate Hagigah, 11b, "One may not expound the topic of forbidden sexual relations before three or more individuals; nor may one expound the act of Creation and the secrets of the beginning of the world before two or more individuals; nor may one expound by oneself the Design of the Divine Chariot, a mystical teaching with regard to the ways God conducts the world, unless he is wise and understands most matters on his own."

=== Terms ===
Originally, Kabbalistic knowledge was believed to be an integral part of the Oral Torah, given by God to Moses on Mount Sinai around the 13th century BCE according to its followers; although some believe that Kabbalah began with Adam.

For a few centuries the esoteric knowledge was referred to by its aspect practice—meditation Hitbonenut (Hebrew: הִתְבּוֹנְנוּת), Rebbe Nachman of Breslov's Hitbodedut (Hebrew: הִתְבּוֹדְדוּת), translated as 'being alone' or 'isolating oneself', or by a different term describing the actual, desired goal of the practice—prophecy (NeVu'a, Hebrew: נְבוּאָה). Kabbalistic scholar Aryeh Kaplan traces the origins of medieval Kabbalistic meditative methods to their inheritance from orally transmitted remnants of the Biblical Prophetic tradition, and reconstructs their terminology and speculated techniques.

From the 5th century BCE, when the works of the Tanakh were edited and canonised and the secret knowledge encrypted within the various writings and scrolls ("Megilot"), esoteric knowledge became referred to as Ma'aseh Merkavah (Hebrew: מַעֲשֶׂה מֶרְכָּבָה) and Ma'aseh B'reshit (Hebrew: מַעֲשֶׂה בְּרֵאשִׁית), respectively 'the act of the Chariot' and 'the act of Creation'. Merkabah mysticism alluded to the encrypted knowledge, and meditation methods within the book of the prophet Ezekiel describing his vision of the "Divine Chariot". B'reshit mysticism referred to the first chapter of Genesis (Hebrew: בְּרֵאשִׁית) in the Torah that is believed to contain secrets of the creation of the universe and forces of nature. These terms received their later historical documentation and description in the second chapter of the Talmudic tractate Hagigah from the early centuries CE.

Confidence in new Prophetic revelation closed after the Biblical return from Babylon in Second Temple Judaism, shifting to canonisation and exegesis of Scripture after Ezra the Scribe. Lesser level prophecy of Ruach Hakodesh remained, with angelic revelations, esoteric heavenly secrets, and eschatological deliverance from Greek and Roman oppression of Apocalyptic literature among early Jewish proto-mystical circles, such as the Book of Daniel and the Dead Sea Scrolls community of Qumran. Early Jewish mystical literature inherited the developing concerns and remnants of Prophetic and Apocalyptic Judaisms.

=== Mystic elements of the Torah ===
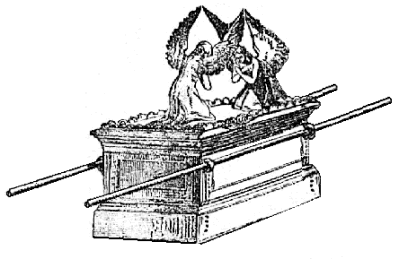
The Ark of the Covenant in Solomon's Temple was the seat for God's presence. Ezekiel and Isaiah had prophetic visions of the angelic heavenly Chariot and Divine Throne

When read by later generations of Kabbalists, the Torah's description of the creation in the Book of Genesis reveals mysteries about God himself, the true nature of Adam and Eve, the Garden of Eden (גַּן עֵדֶן), the Tree of Knowledge of Good and Evil (עֵץ הַדַּעַת טוֹב וְרַע), and the Tree of Life (עֵץ החַיִּים), as well as the interaction of these supernatural entities with the Serpent (נָחָשׁ), which leads to disaster when they eat the forbidden fruit (פְּרִי עֵץ הַדַּעַת), as recorded in Genesis 3.

The Bible provides ample additional material for mythic and mystical speculation. The prophet Ezekiel's visions in particular attracted much mystical speculation, as did Isaiah's Temple vision. Other mystical events include Jacob's vision of the ladder to heaven, and Moses' encounters with the Burning bush and God on Mount Sinai.

The 72-letter name of God which is used in Jewish mysticism for meditation purposes is derived from the Hebrew verbal utterance Moses spoke in the presence of an angel, while the Sea of Reeds parted, allowing the Hebrews to escape their approaching attackers. The miracle of the Exodus, which led to Moses receiving the Ten Commandments and the Jewish Orthodox view of the acceptance of the Torah at Mount Sinai, preceded the creation of the first Jewish nation approximately three hundred years before King Saul.

== Talmudic era ==
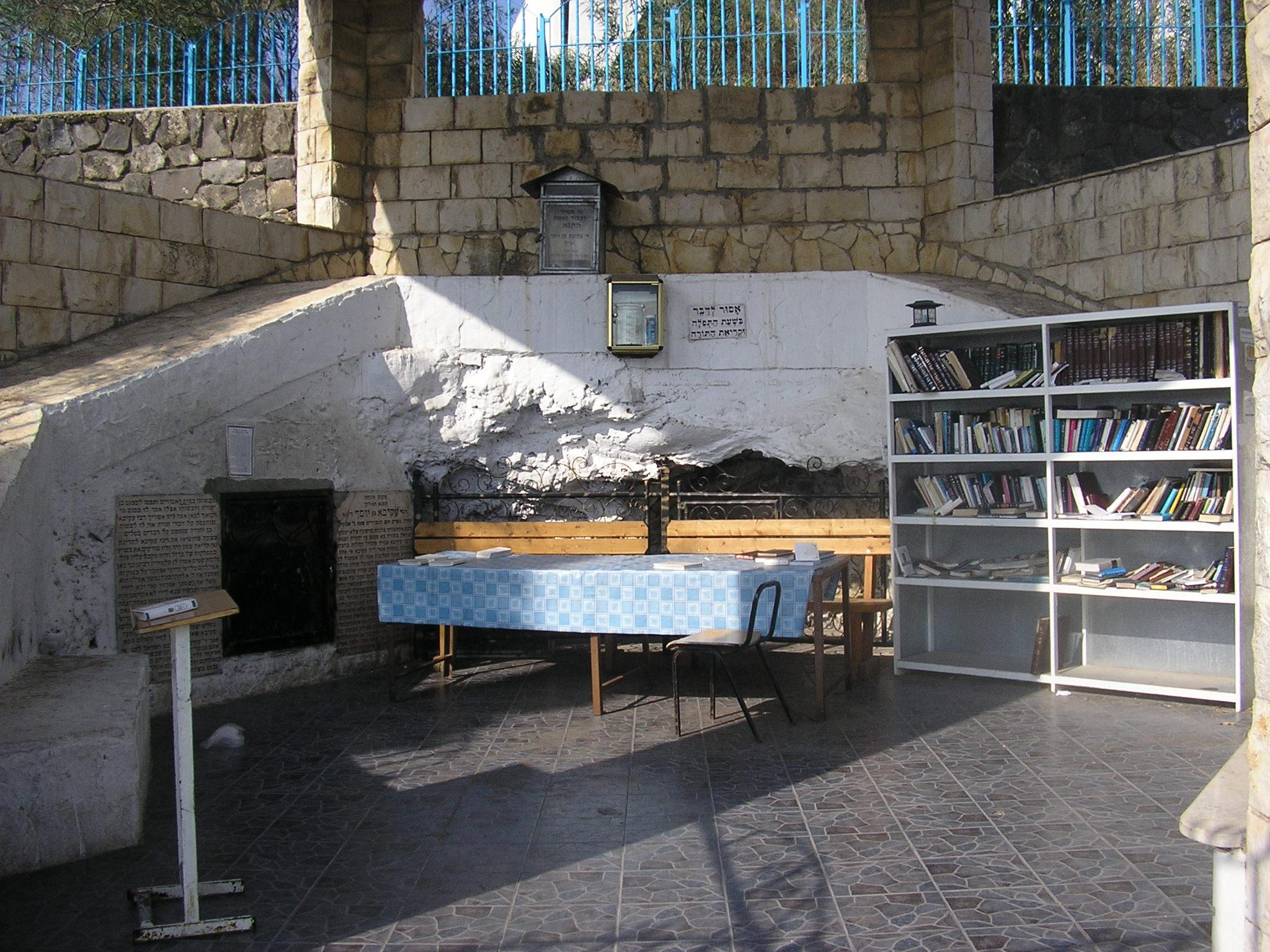
Grave of Rabbi Akiva in Tiberias. He features in Hekhalot mystical literature, and as one of the four who entered the Pardes

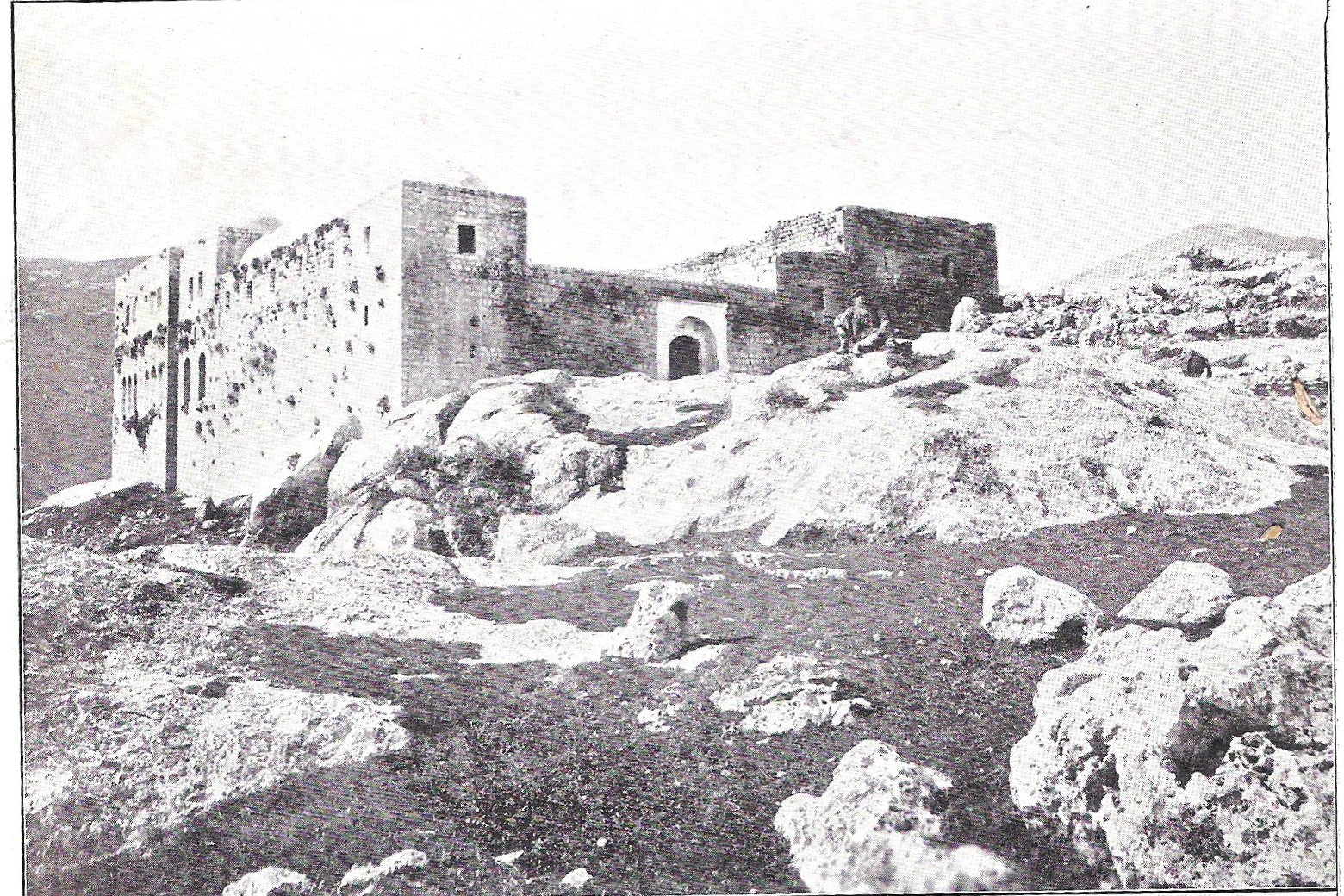
The grave of Shimon bar Yochai in Meron before 1899. A Talmudic Tanna, he is the mystical teacher in the central Kabbalistic work, the Zohar

In early Rabbinic Judaism (the early centuries of the 1st millennium CE), the terms Ma'aseh Bereshit ('Works of Creation') and Ma'aseh Merkabah ('Works of the Divine Throne/Chariot') clearly indicate the Midrashic nature of these speculations; they are really based upon Genesis 1 and Ezekiel 1:4–28, while the names Sitrei Torah ('Hidden aspects of the Torah') (Talmud Hag. 13a) and Razei Torah ('Torah secrets') (Ab. vi. 1) indicate their character as secret lore.

Talmudic doctrine forbade the public teaching of esoteric doctrines and warned of their dangers. In the Mishnah (Hagigah 2:1), rabbis were warned to teach the mystical creation doctrines only to one student at a time. To highlight the danger, in one Jewish aggadic ("legendary") anecdote, four prominent rabbis of the Mishnaic period (1st century CE) are said to have visited the Orchard (that is, Paradise, pardes, Hebrew: פרדס lit. 'orchard'):

Four men entered pardes—Ben Azzai, Ben Zoma, Acher (Elisha ben Abuyah), and Akiba. Ben Azzai looked and died; Ben Zoma looked and went mad; Acher destroyed the plants; Akiba entered in peace and departed in peace.

In notable readings of this legend, only Rabbi Akiba was fit to handle the study of mystical doctrines. The Tosafot, medieval commentaries on the Talmud, say that the four sages "did not go up literally, but it appeared to them as if they went up". On the other hand, Louis Ginzberg, writes in the Jewish Encyclopedia (1901–1906) that the journey to paradise "is to be taken literally and not allegorically".

In contrast to the Kabbalists, Maimonides interprets pardes as philosophy and not mysticism.

== Medieval emergence of the Kabbalah ==
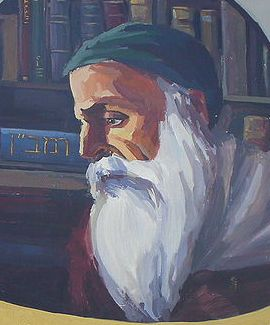
The 13th-century eminence of Nachmanides, a classic rabbinic figure, gave Kabbalah mainstream acceptance through his Torah commentary

Modern scholars have identified several mystical brotherhoods that functioned in Europe starting in the 12th century. Some, such as the "Iyyun Circle" and the "Unique Cherub Circle", were truly esoteric, remaining largely anonymous. The first documented historical emergence of Theosophical Kabbalistic doctrine occurred among Jewish Sages of Provence and Languedoc in southern France in the latter 1100s, with the appearance or consolidation of the mysterious work the Bahir (Book of "Brightness"), a midrash describing God's sephirot attributes as a dynamic interacting hypostatic drama in the Divine realm, and the school of Isaac the Blind (1160–1235) among critics of the rationalist influence of Maimonides. From there Kabbalah spread to Catalonia in north-east Spain around the central Rabbinic figure of Nahmanides (the Ramban) (1194–1270) in the early 1200s, with a Neoplatonic orientation focused on the upper sephirot. Subsequently, Kabbalistic doctrine reached its fullest classic expression among Castilian Kabbalists from the latter 1200s, with the Zohar (Book of "Splendor") literature, concerned with cosmic healing of gnostic dualities between the lower, revealed male and female attributes of God.

Rishonim ("Elder Sages") of exoteric Judaism who were deeply involved in Kabbalistic activity, gave the Kabbalah wide scholarly acceptance, including Nahmanides and Bahya ben Asher (Rabbeinu Behaye) (died 1340), whose classic commentaries on the Torah reference Kabbalistic esotericism.

Among the Jews of Spain, the study of Qabalah and philosophy was not a peripheral phenomenon; it often occurred alongside and within Talmudic scholarship. In the early 15th century, there was a notable resurgence of interest in Qabalah, possibly in response to the forced conversions to Christianity in the late 14th century. This resurgence likely reflected a need for theological consolidation in the face of both Christianity and contemporary philosophical influences.

Many Orthodox Jews reject the idea that Kabbalah underwent significant historical development or change such as has been proposed above. After the composition known as the Zohar was presented to the public in the 13th century, the term "Kabbalah" began to refer more specifically to teachings derived from, or related to, the Zohar. At an even later time, the term began to generally be applied to Zoharic teachings as elaborated upon by Isaac Luria (the Arizal). Historians generally date the start of Kabbalah as a major influence in Jewish thought and practice with the publication of the Zohar and climaxing with the spread of the Lurianic teachings. The majority of Haredi Jews accept the Zohar as the representative of the Ma'aseh Merkavah and Ma'aseh B'reshit that are referred to in Talmudic texts.

=== Ecstatic Kabbalah ===
Contemporary with the Zoharic efflorescence of Spanish Theosophical-Theurgic Kabbalah, Spanish exilarch Abraham Abulafia developed his own alternative, Maimonidean system of Ecstatic-Prophetic Kabbalah meditation, each consolidating aspects of a claimed inherited mystical tradition from Biblical times. This was the classic time when various different interpretations of an esoteric meaning to Torah were articulated among Jewish thinkers. Abulafia interpreted Theosophical Kabbalah's Sephirot Divine attributes, not as supernal hypostases which he opposed, but in psychological terms. Instead of influencing harmony in the divine real by theurgy, his meditative scheme aimed for mystical union with God, drawing down prophetic influx on the individual. He saw this meditation using Divine Names as a superior form of Kabbalistic ancient tradition. His version of Kabbalah, followed in the medieval eastern Mediterranean, remained a marginal stream to mainstream Theosophical Kabbalah development. Abulafian elements were later incorporated into the 16th century theosophical Kabbalistic systemisations of Moses Cordovero and Hayim Vital. Through them, later Hasidic Judaism incorporated elements of unio mystica and psychological focus from Abulafia.

== Early modern era ==
=== Lurianic Kabbalah ===
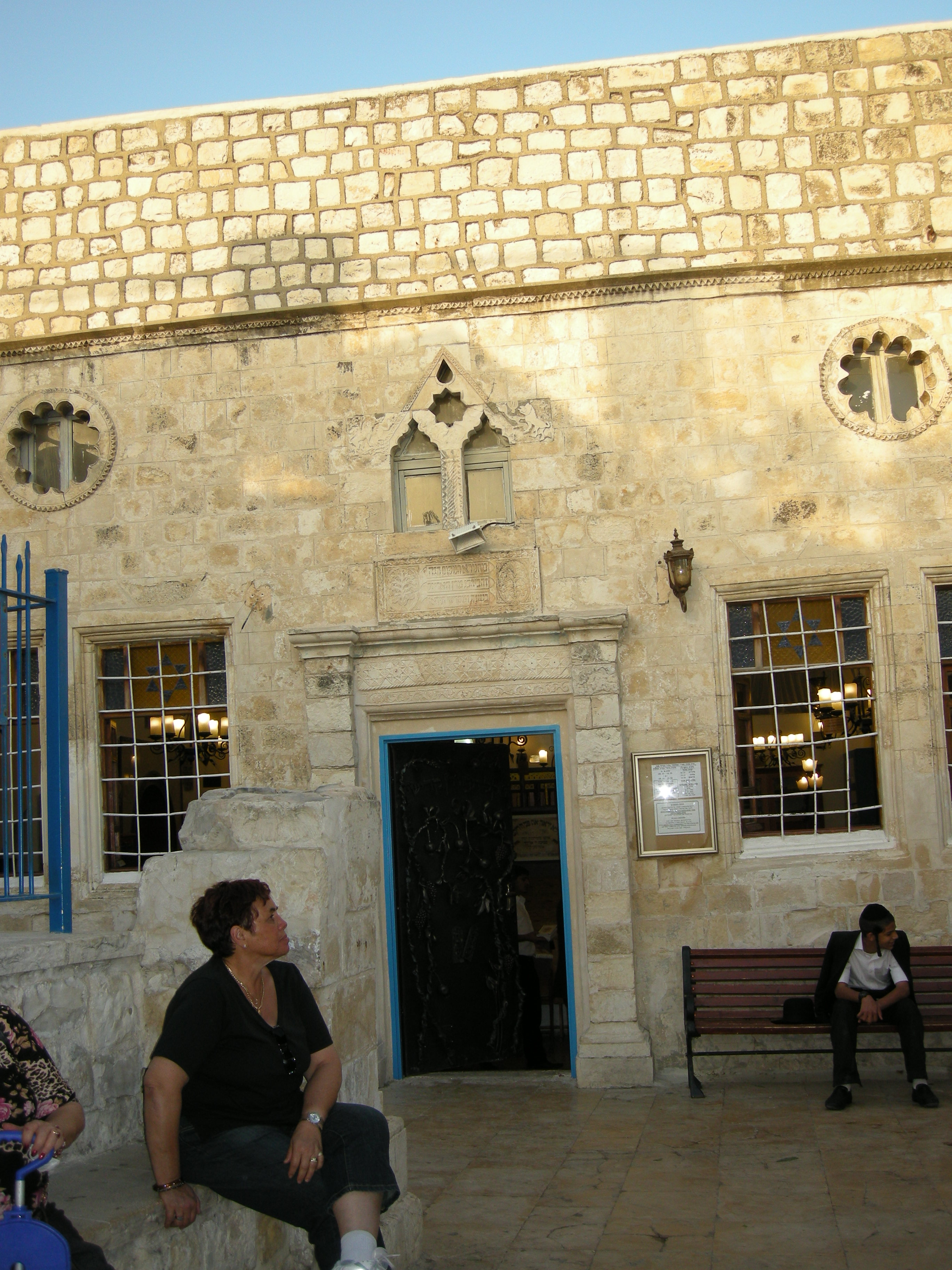
The leading scholars of Safed in 16th-century invigorated mainstream Judaism through new legal, liturgical, exegetical and Lurianic-mythological developments.

Following the upheavals and dislocations in the Jewish world as a result of anti-Judaism during the Middle Ages, and the national trauma of the expulsion from Spain in 1492, closing the Spanish Jewish flowering, Jews began to search for signs of when the long-awaited Jewish Messiah would come to comfort them in their painful exiles. In the 16th century, the community of Safed in the Galilee became the centre of Jewish mystical, exegetical, legal and liturgical developments. The Safed mystics responded to the Spanish expulsion by turning Kabbalistic doctrine and practice towards a messianic focus. Moses Cordovero (The RAMAK 1522–1570) and his school popularized the teachings of the Zohar which had until then been only a restricted work. Cordovero's comprehensive works achieved the first (quasi-rationalistic) of Theosophical Kabbalah's two systemisations, harmonising preceding interpretations of the Zohar on its own apparent terms. The author of the Shulkhan Arukh (the normative Jewish "Code of Law"), Yosef Karo (1488–1575), was also a scholar of Kabbalah who kept a personal mystical diary. Moshe Alshich wrote a mystical commentary on the Torah, and Shlomo Alkabetz wrote Kabbalistic commentaries and poems.

The messianism of the Safed mystics culminated in Kabbalah receiving its biggest transformation in the Jewish world with the explication of its new interpretation from Isaac Luria (The ARI 1534–1572), by his disciples Hayim Vital and Israel Sarug. Both transcribed Luria's teachings (in variant forms) gaining them widespread popularity, Sarug taking Lurianic Kabbalah to Europe, Vital authoring the latterly canonical version. Luria's teachings came to rival the influence of the Zohar and Luria stands, alongside Moses de Leon, as the most influential mystic in Jewish history. Lurianic Kabbalah gave Theosophical Kabbalah its second, complete (supra-rational) of two systemisations, reading the Zohar in light of its most esoteric sections (the Idrot), replacing the broken Sephirot attributes of God with rectified Partzufim (Divine Personas), embracing reincarnation, repair, and the urgency of cosmic Jewish messianism dependent on each person's soul tasks.

=== Influence on non-Jewish society ===
From the European Renaissance on, Judaic Kabbalah became a significant influence in non-Jewish culture, fully divorced from the separately evolving Judaic tradition. Kabbalah received the interest of Christian Hebraist scholars and occultists, who freely syncretised and adapted it to diverse non-Jewish spiritual traditions and belief systems of Western esotericism. Christian Cabalists from the 15th–18th centuries adapted what they saw as ancient Biblical wisdom to Christian theology, while Hermeticism lead to Kabbalah's incorporation into Western magic through Hermetic Qabalah. Presentations of Kabbalah in occult and New Age books on Kabbalah bear little resemblance to Judaic Kabbalah.

=== Ban on studying Kabbalah ===
The Rabbinic ban on studying Kabbalah in Jewish society was lifted by the efforts of the 16th-century kabbalist Avraham Azulai (1570–1643).

I have found it written that all that has been decreed Above forbidding open involvement in the Wisdom of Truth [Kabbalah] was [only meant for] the limited time period until the year 5,250 (1490 C.E.). From then on after is called the "Last Generation", and what was forbidden is [now] allowed. And permission is granted to occupy ourselves in the [study of] Zohar. And from the year 5,300 (1540 C.E.) it is most desirable that the masses both those great and small [in Torah], should occupy themselves [in the study of Kabbalah], as it says in the Raya M'hemna [a section of the Zohar]. And because in this merit King Mashiach will come in the future—and not in any other merit—it is not proper to be discouraged [from the study of Kabbalah].

The question, however, is whether the ban ever existed in the first place. Concerning the above quote by Avraham Azulai, it has found many versions in English, another is this

From the year 1540 and onward, the basic levels of Kabbalah must be taught publicly to everyone, young and old. Only through Kabbalah will we forever eliminate war, destruction, and man's inhumanity to his fellow man.

The lines concerning the year 1490 are also missing from the Hebrew edition of Hesed L'Avraham, the source work that both of these quote from. Furthermore, by Azulai's view the ban was lifted thirty years before his birth, a time that would have corresponded with Haim Vital's publication of the teaching of Isaac Luria. Moshe Isserles understood there to be only a minor restriction, in his words, "One's belly must be full of meat and wine, discerning between the prohibited and the permitted." He is supported by the Bier Hetiv, the Pithei Teshuva as well as the Vilna Gaon. The Vilna Gaon says, "There was never any ban or enactment restricting the study of the wisdom of Kabbalah. Any who says there is has never studied Kabbalah, has never seen PaRDeS, and speaks as an ignoramus."

=== Sefardi and Mizrahi ===
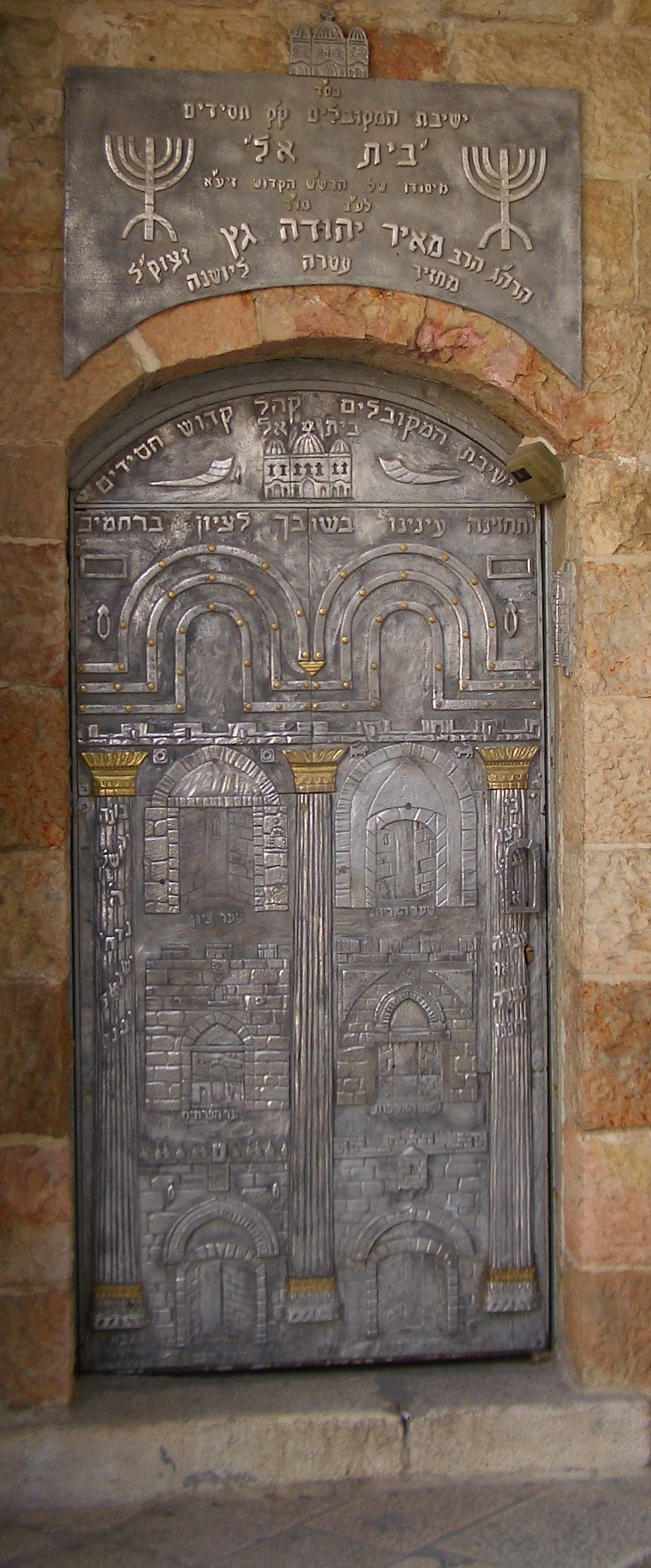
Synagogue Beit El Jerusalem. Oriental Judaism has its own chain of Kabbalah

The Kabbalah of the Sefardi (Iberian Peninsula) and Mizrahi (Middle East, North Africa, and the Caucasus) Torah scholars has a long history. Kabbalah in various forms was widely studied, commented upon, and expanded by North African, Turkish, Yemenite, and Asian scholars from the 16th century onward. It flourished among Sefardic Jews in Tzfat (Safed), even before the arrival of Isaac Luria. Yosef Karo, author of the Shulchan Arukh was part of the Tzfat school of Kabbalah. Shlomo Alkabetz, author of the hymn Lekhah Dodi, taught there.

His disciple Moses ben Jacob Cordovero (or Cordoeiro) authored Pardes Rimonim, an organised, exhaustive compilation of kabbalistic teachings on a variety of subjects up to that point. Cordovero headed the academy of Tzfat until his death, when Isaac Luria rose to prominence. Rabbi Moshe's disciple Eliyahu De Vidas authored the classic work, Reishit Chochma, combining kabbalistic and mussar (moral) teachings. Chaim Vital also studied under Cordovero, but with the arrival of Luria became his main disciple. Vital claimed to be the only one authorised to transmit the Ari's teachings, though other disciples also published books presenting Luria's teachings.

The Oriental Kabbalist tradition continues until today among Sephardi and Mizrachi Hakham sages and study circles. Among leading figures were the Yemenite Shalom Sharabi (1720–1777) of the Beit El Synagogue, the Jerusalemite Hida (1724–1806), the Baghdad leader Ben Ish Chai (1832–1909), and the Abuhatzeira dynasty.

=== Maharal ===
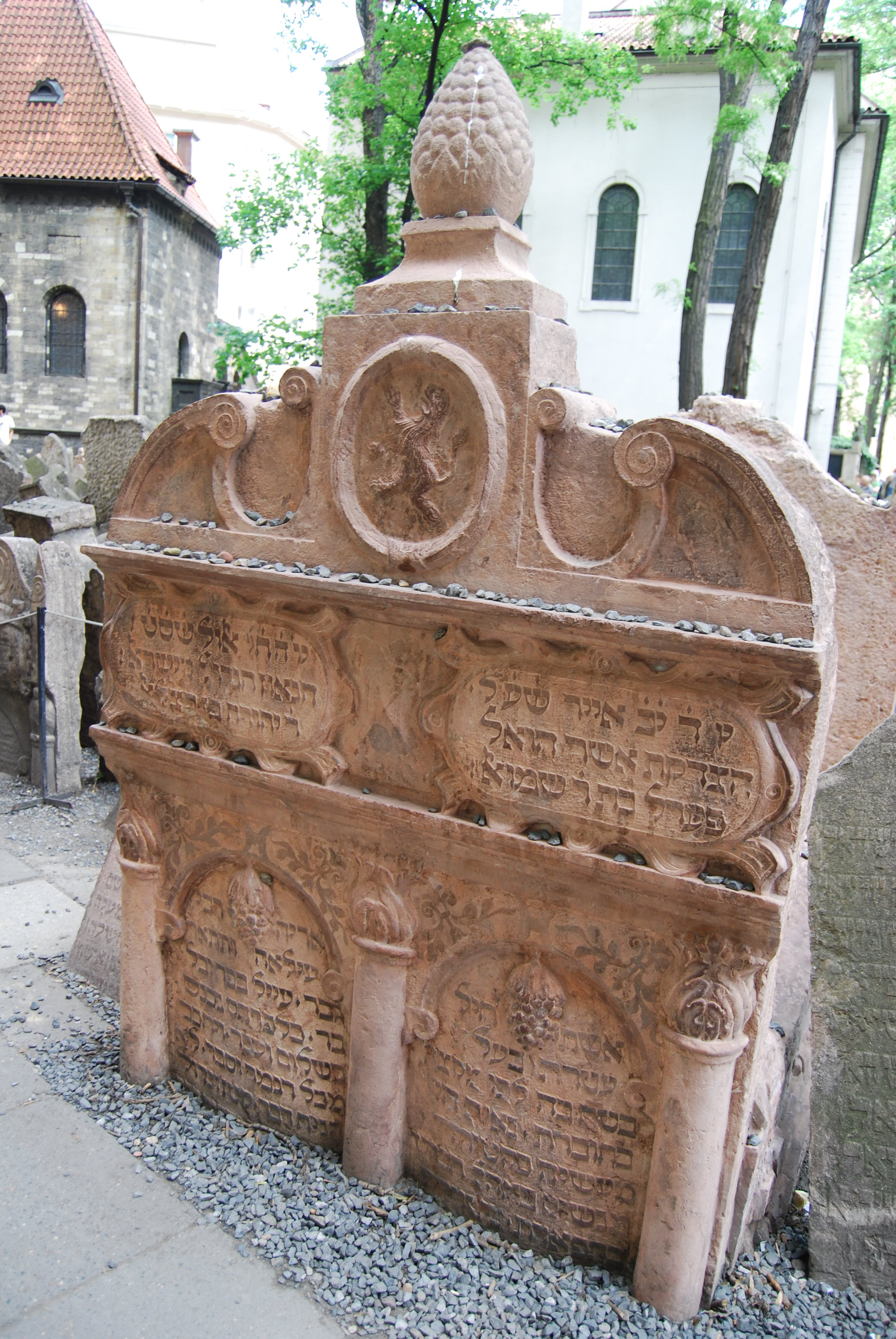
The 16th-century Maharal of Prague articulated a mystical exegesis in philosophical language

One of the most innovative theologians in early-modern Judaism was Judah Loew ben Bezalel (1525–1609) known as the "Maharal of Prague". Many of his written works survive and are studied for their unusual combination of the mystical and philosophical approaches in Judaism. While conversant in Kabbalistic learning, he expresses Jewish mystical thought in his own individual approach without reference to Kabbalistic terms. The Maharal is most well known in popular culture for the legend of the golem of Prague, associated with him in folklore. However, his thought influenced Hasidism, for example being studied in the introspective Przysucha school. During the 20th century, Isaac Hutner (1906–1980) continued to spread the Maharal's works indirectly through his own teachings and publications within the non-Hasidic yeshiva world.

=== Sabbatian antinomian movements ===
The spiritual and mystical yearnings of many Jews remained frustrated after the death of Isaac Luria and his disciples and colleagues. No hope was in sight for many following the devastation and mass killings of the pogroms that followed in the wake of the Chmielnicki Uprising (1648–1654), the largest single massacre of Jews until the Holocaust, and it was at this time that a controversial scholar by the name of Sabbatai Zevi (1626–1676) captured the hearts and minds of the Jewish masses of that time with the promise of a newly minted messianic Millennialism in the form of his own personage.

His charisma, mystical teachings that included repeated pronunciations of the holy Tetragrammaton in public, tied to an unstable personality, and with the help of his greatest enthusiast, Nathan of Gaza, convinced the Jewish masses that the Jewish Messiah had finally come. It seemed that the esoteric teachings of Kabbalah had found their "champion" and had triumphed, but this era of Jewish history unravelled when Zevi became an apostate to Judaism by converting to Islam after he was arrested by the Ottoman Sultan and threatened with execution for attempting a plan to conquer the world and rebuild the Temple in Jerusalem. Unwilling to give up their messianic expectations, a minority of Zevi's Jewish followers converted to Islam along with him.

Many of his followers, known as Sabbatians, continued to worship him in secret, explaining his conversion not as an effort to save his life but to recover the sparks of the holy in each religion, and most leading rabbis were always on guard to root them out. The Dönmeh movement in modern Turkey is a surviving remnant of the Sabbatian schism. Theologies developed by leaders of Sabbatian movements dealt with antinomian redemption of the realm of impurity through sin, based on Lurianic theory. Moderate views reserved this dangerous task for the divine messiah Sabbatai Zevi alone, while his followers remained observant Jews. Radical forms spoke of the messianic transcendence of Torah, and required Sabbatean followers to emulate him, either in private or publicly.

Due to the chaos caused in the Jewish world, the rabbinic prohibition against studying Kabbalah established itself firmly within the Jewish religion. One of the conditions allowing a man to study and engage himself in the Kabbalah was to be at least forty years old. This age requirement came about during this period and is not Talmudic in origin but rabbinic. Many Jews are familiar with this ruling, but are not aware of its origins. Moreover, the prohibition is not halakhic in nature. According to Moses Cordovero, halakhically, one must be of age twenty to engage in the Kabbalah. Many famous kabbalists, including the ARI, Rabbi Nachman of Breslov, Yehuda Ashlag, were younger than twenty when they began.

The Sabbatian movement was followed by that of the Frankists, disciples of Jacob Frank (1726–1791), who eventually became an apostate to Judaism by apparently converting to Catholicism. Frank took the Sabbatean impulse to its nihilistic end, declaring himself part of a messianic trinity along with his daughter, and that breaking all of Torah was its fulfilment. This era of disappointment did not stem the Jewish masses' yearnings for "mystical" leadership.

== Modern era ==
=== Traditional Kabbalah ===
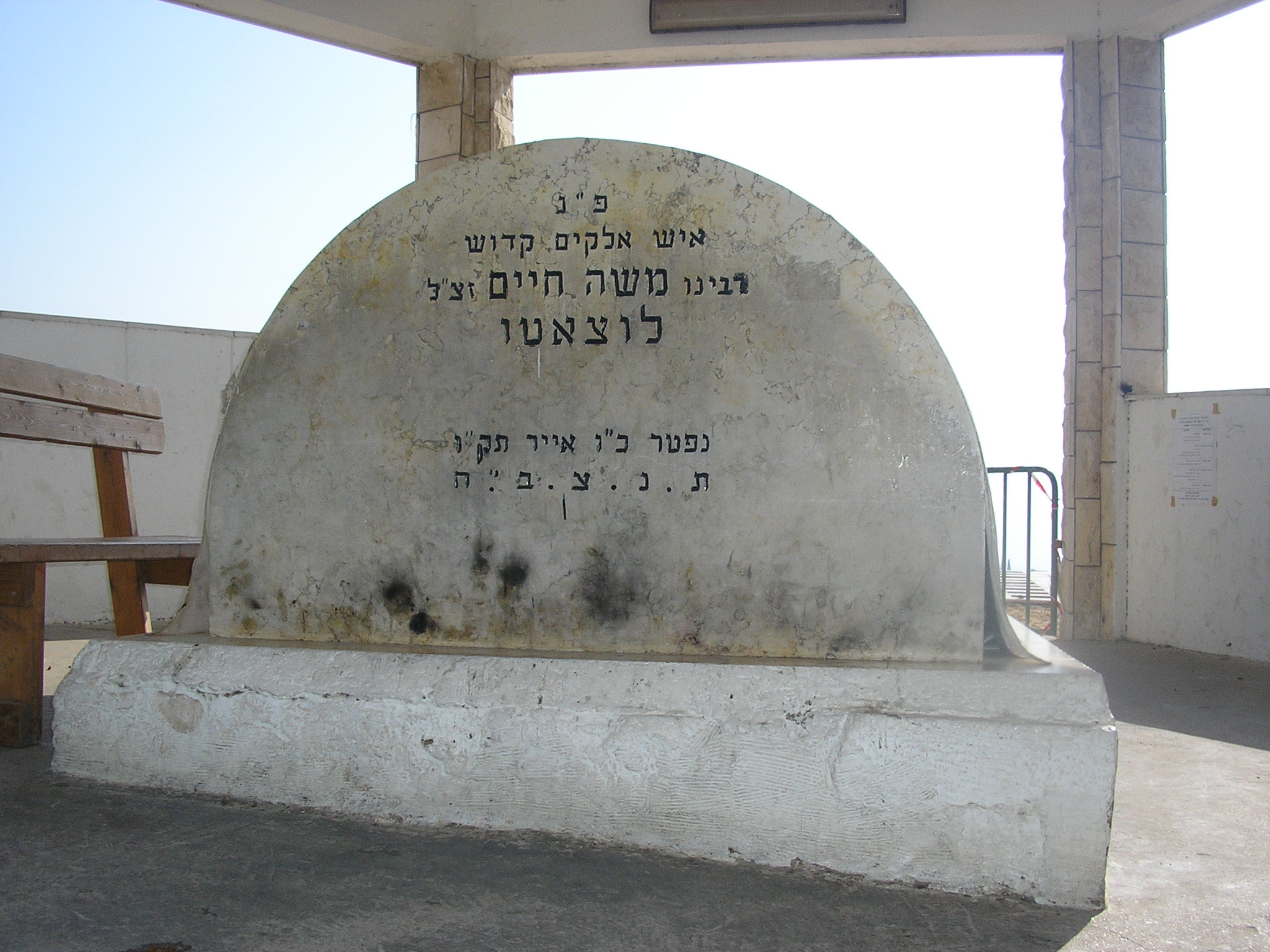
Moshe Chaim Luzzatto, a leading Italian kabbalist, also wrote secular works, which the Haskalah see as the start of modern Hebrew literature

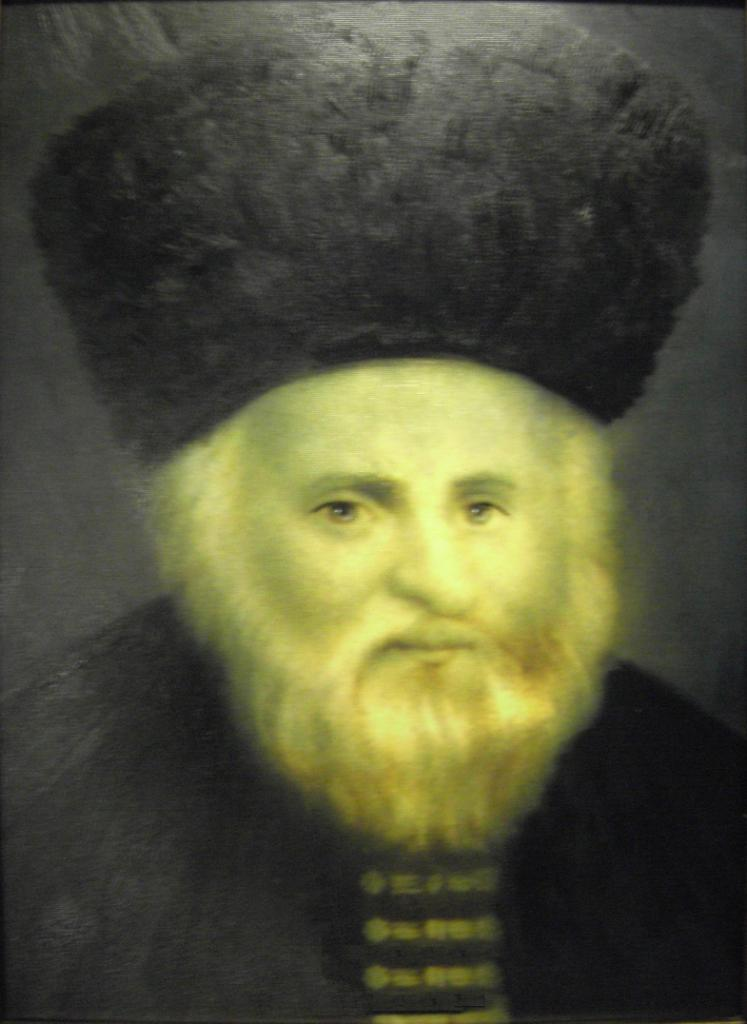
The Vilna Gaon, 18th-century leader of rabbinic opposition to Hasidism—a Kabbalist who opposed Hasidic doctrinal and practical innovations

Moshe Chaim Luzzatto (1707–1746), based in Italy, was a precocious Talmudic scholar who deduced a need for the public teaching and study of Kabbalah. He established a yeshiva for Kabbalah study and actively recruited students. He wrote copious manuscripts in an appealing clear Hebrew style, all of which gained the attention of both admirers and rabbinical critics, who feared another "Sabbatai Zevi" (false messiah) in the making. His rabbinical opponents forced him to close his school, hand over and destroy many of his most precious unpublished kabbalistic writings, and go into exile in the Netherlands. He eventually moved to the Land of Israel. Some of his most important works, such as Derekh Hashem, survive and serve as a gateway to the world of Jewish mysticism.

Elijah of Vilna (Vilna Gaon) (1720–1797), based in Lithuania, had his teachings encoded and publicised by his disciples, such as Chaim Volozhin's posthumously published the mystical-ethical work Nefesh HaChaim. He staunchly opposed the new Hasidic movement and warned against their public displays of religious fervour inspired by the mystical teachings of their rabbis. Although the Vilna Gaon did not look with favor on the Hasidic movement, he did not prohibit the study and engagement in the Kabbalah. This is evident from his writings in the Even Shlema. "He that is able to understand secrets of the Torah and does not try to understand them will be judged harshly, may God have mercy". (The Vilna Gaon, Even Shlema, 8:24). "The Redemption will only come about through learning Torah, and the essence of the Redemption depends upon learning Kabbalah" (The Vilna Gaon, Even Shlema, 11:3).

In the Oriental tradition of Kabbalah, Shalom Sharabi (1720–1777) from Yemen was a major esoteric clarifier of the works of the Ari. The Beit El Synagogue, "yeshivah of the kabbalists", which he came to head, was one of the few communities to bring Lurianic meditation into communal prayer.

=== Hasidic Judaism ===
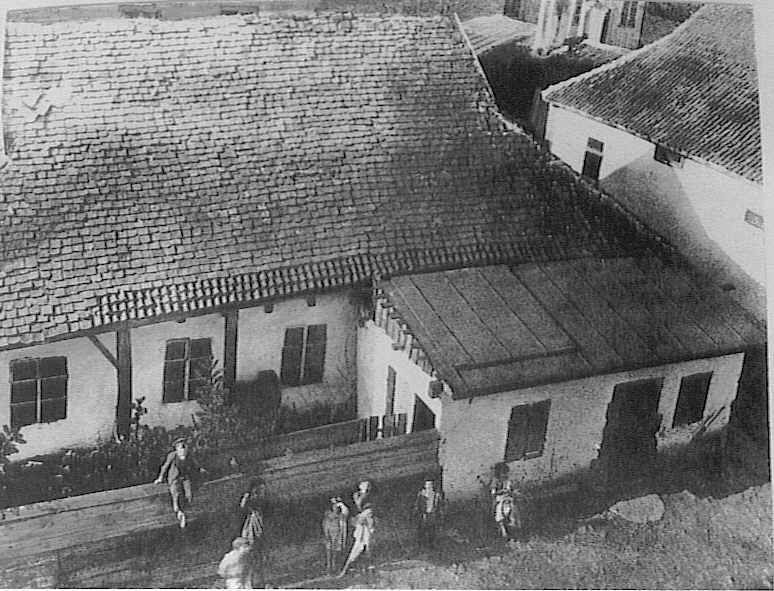
Synagogue of the Baal Shem Tov, founder of Hasidism, in Medzhybizh (Ukraine). It gave a new phase to Jewish mysticism, seeking its popularisation through internal correspondence.

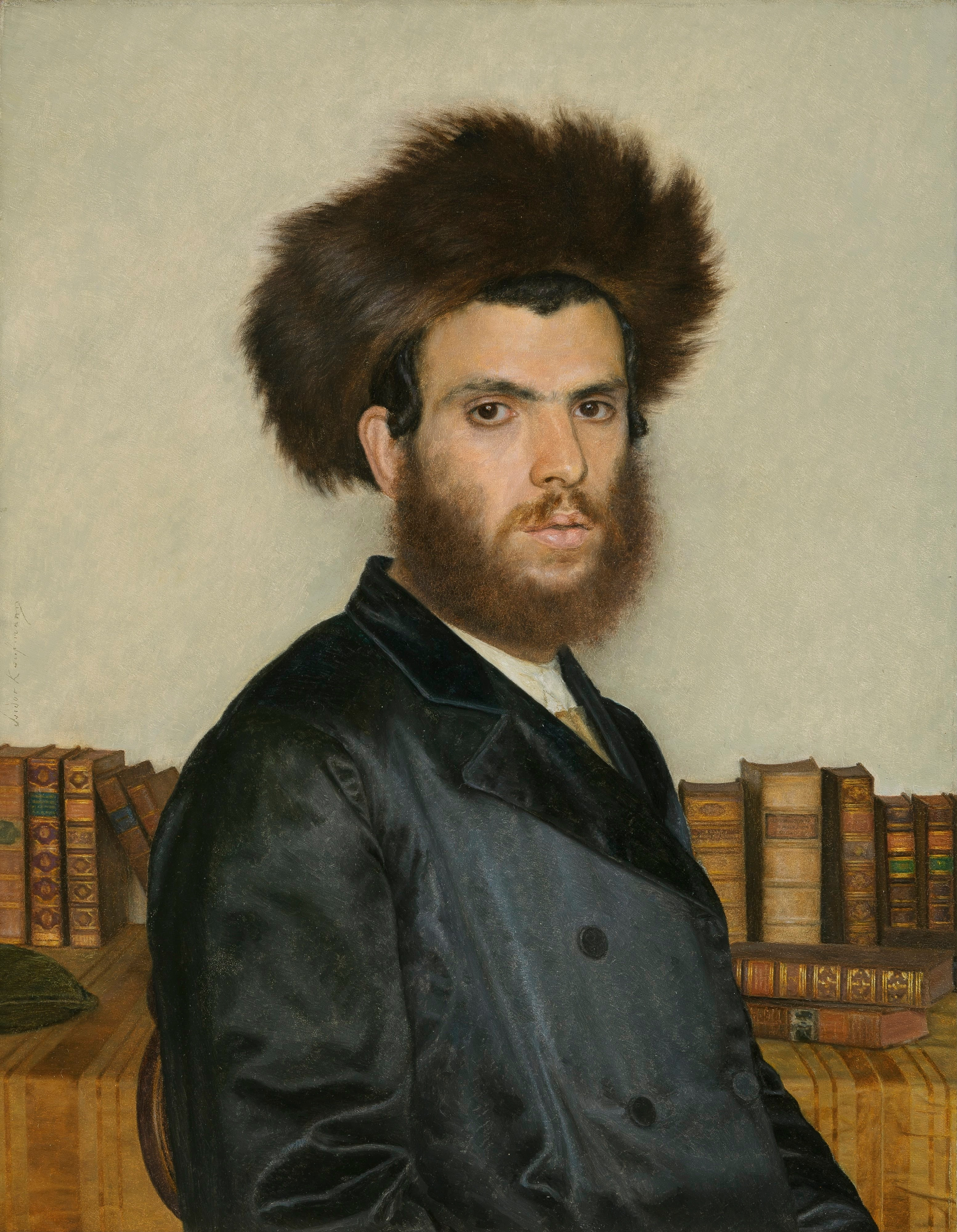
The Kabbalist (c. 1910–1920), portrait of a Hasidic man in Jewish religious clothing performed by the Austro-Hungarian Jewish painter Isidor Kaufmann (Jewish Museum, New York)

Yisrael ben Eliezer Baal Shem Tov (1698–1760), founder of Hasidism in the area of Ukraine, spread teachings based on Lurianic Kabbalah, but adapted to a different aim of immediate psychological perception of Divine Omnipresence amidst the mundane. The emotional, ecstatic fervour of early Hasidism developed from previous Nistarim circles of mystical activity, but instead sought communal revival of the common folk by reframing Judaism around the central principle of devekut (mystical cleaving to God) for all.

This new approach turned formerly esoteric elite kabbalistic theory into a popular social mysticism movement for the first time, with its own doctrines, classic texts, teachings and customs. From the Baal Shem Tov sprang the wide ongoing schools of Hasidic Judaism, each with different approaches and thought. Hasidism instituted a new concept of Tzadik leadership in Jewish mysticism, where the elite scholars of mystical texts now took on a social role as embodiments and intercessors of Divinity for the masses. With the 19th-century consolidation of the movement, leadership became dynastic.

Among later Hasidic schools Rebbe Nachman of Breslov (1772–1810), the great-grandson of the Baal Shem Tov, revitalised and further expanded the latter's teachings, amassing a following of thousands in Ukraine, Belarus, Lithuania and Poland. In a unique amalgam of Hasidic and Mitnaged approaches, Rebbe Nachman emphasised study of both Kabbalah and serious Torah scholarship to his disciples. His teachings also differed from the way other Hasidic groups were developing, as he rejected the idea of hereditary Hasidic dynasties and taught that each Hasid must "search for the tzaddik ('saintly/righteous person')" for himself and within himself.

The Habad-Lubavitch intellectual school of Hasidism broke away from General-Hasidism's emotional faith orientation, by making the mind central as the route to the internal heart. Its texts combine what they view as rational investigation with explanation of Kabbalah through articulating unity in a common Divine essence. In recent times, the messianic element latent in Hasidism has come to the fore in Habad.

=== Haskalah opposition to mysticism ===
The Jewish Haskalah (Hebrew: הַשְׂכָּלָה) enlightenment movement from the late 1700s renewed an ideology of rationalism in Judaism, giving birth to critical Judaic scholarship. It presented Judaism in apologetic terms, stripped of mysticism and myth, in line with Jewish emancipation.

Many foundational historians of Judaism such as Heinrich Graetz, criticised Kabbalah as a foreign import that compromised historical Judaism. In the 20th century Gershom Scholem overturned Jewish historiography, presenting the centrality of Jewish mysticism and Kabbalah to historical Judaism, and their subterranean life as the true creative renewing spirit of Jewish thought and culture. His influence contributed to the flourishing of Jewish mysticism academia today, its impact on wider intellectual currents, and the contribution of mystical spirituality in modernist Jewish denominations today. Traditionalist Kabbalah and Hasidism, meanwhile, continued outside the academic interest in it.

=== 20th-century influence ===
Jewish mysticism has influenced the thought of some major Jewish theologians, philosophers, writers and thinkers in the 20th century, outside of Kabbalistic or Hasidic traditions. The first Chief Rabbi of Mandate Palestine, Abraham Isaac Kook was a mystical thinker who drew heavily on Kabbalistic notions through his own poetic terminology. His writings are concerned with fusing the false divisions between sacred and secular, rational and mystical, legal and imaginative.

Students of Joseph B. Soloveitchik, figurehead of American Modern Orthodox Judaism have read the influence of Kabbalistic symbols in his philosophical works. Neo-Hasidism, rather than Kabbalah, shaped Martin Buber's philosophy of dialogue and Abraham Joshua Heschel's Conservative Judaism. Lurianic symbols of Tzimtzum and Shevirah have informed Holocaust theologians.

Gershom Scholem's central academic influence on reshaping Jewish historiography in favour of myth and imagination, made historical arcane Kabbalah of relevance to wide intellectual discourse in the 20th century. Moshe Idel traces the influences of Kabbalistic and Hasidic concepts on diverse thinkers such as Walter Benjamin, Jacques Derrida, Franz Kafka, Franz Rosenzweig, Arnaldo Momigliano, Paul Celan and George Steiner.

Harold Bloom has seen Kabbalistic hermeneutics as the paradigm for western literary criticism. Sanford Drob discusses the direct and indirect influence of Kabbalah on the depth psychologies of Sigmund Freud and Carl Jung, as well as modern and postmodern philosophers, in his project to develop new intellectual relevance and open dialogue for kabbalah.

The interaction of Kabbalah with modern physics, as with other mystical traditions, has generated its own literature. Traditional Kabbalist Yitzchak Ginsburgh brings esoteric dimensions of advanced kabbalistic symmetry into relationship with mathematics and the sciences, including renaming the elementary particles of Quantum theory with Kabbalistic Hebrew names, and developing kabbalistic approaches to debates in Evolutionary theory.

== See also ==
- List of Jewish Kabbalists
- Aggadah – Non-legalistic exegetical texts in the classical rabbinic literature
- Ancient Jewish magic – Magical practices employed in ancient Israel and early Judaism
- Ayin and Yesh – "Nothingness" in Kabbalah and Hasidic philosophy
- English Qaballa – English Qaballa system of James Lees
- Gnosticism – Early Christian and Jewish religious systems
- Ka-Bala – Talking 1967 board game
- Notarikon – Kabbalistic method of deriving a word
- Temurah – Method in Kabbalah
