= Merkabah mysticism =

School of early Jewish mysticism

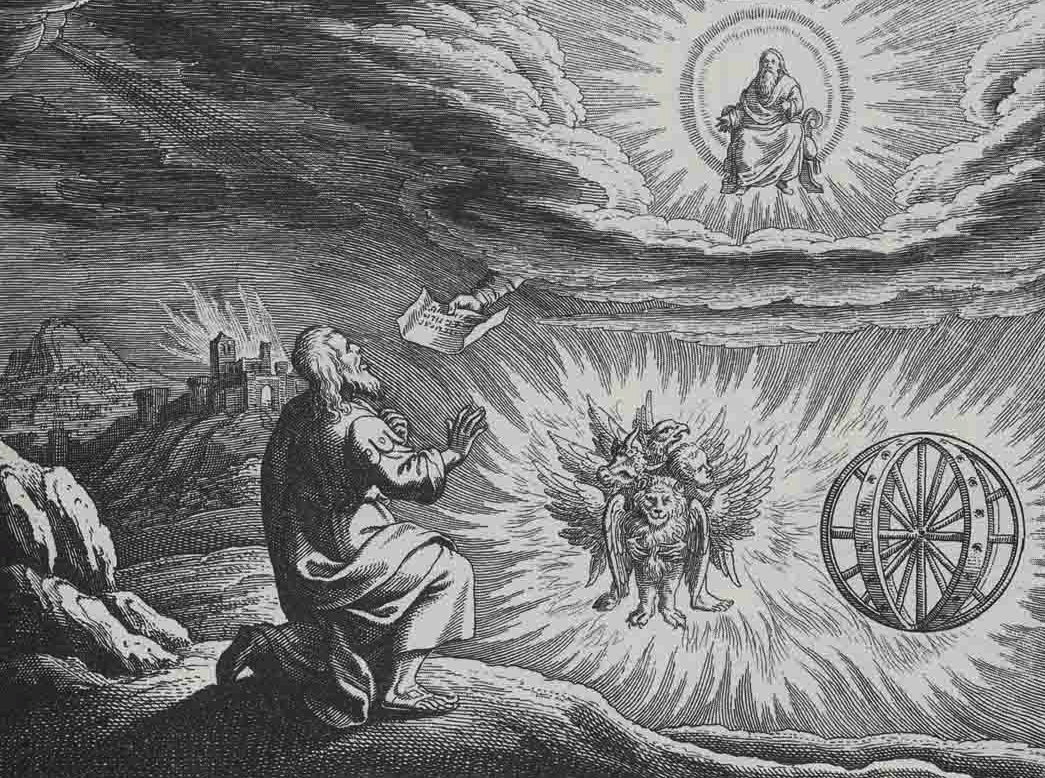
Copy of Matthäus Merian's engraving of Ezekiel's vision (1670)

Merkabah (Hebrew: מֶרְכָּבָה, romanized: merkāḇā, lit. 'chariot') or Merkavah mysticism (lit. Chariot mysticism) is a school of early Jewish mysticism (c. 100 BCE–1000 CE), centered on visions such as those found in Ezekiel 1 or in the hekhalot literature ("palaces" literature), concerning stories of ascents to the heavenly palaces and the Throne of God.

The main corpus of the Merkabah literature was composed in the period 200–700 CE, although later references to the Chariot tradition can also be found in the literature of the Hasidim of Ashkenaz in the Middle Ages. A major text in this tradition is the Maaseh Merkabah (Hebrew: מַעֲשֵׂה מֶרְכָּבָה, romanized: maʿăśē merkāḇā, lit. 'Work of the Chariot').

== Etymology ==
The noun merkavah "thing to ride in, cart" is derived from a verb, Biblical Hebrew: רכב, romanized: r-k-b, with the general meaning "to ride". The word "chariot" is found 44 times in the Masoretic Text of the Hebrew Bible, most referring to normal chariots on earth. Although the concept of the Merkabah is associated with Ezekiel's vision, the word is not used in Ezekiel 1.

However, when left untranslated, in English the Hebrew term merkavah relates to the throne-chariot of God in prophetic visions. It is most closely associated with the vision in Ezekiel 1 of the four-wheeled vehicle driven by four hayyot "living creatures" with four wings; the angels have the faces of a man, lion, ox, and a large predatory bird. The last animal, the נֶשֶׁר nešer, is often translated "eagle", but today it can also refer to the Eurasian griffon vulture.

== Ezekiel's vision of the chariot ==
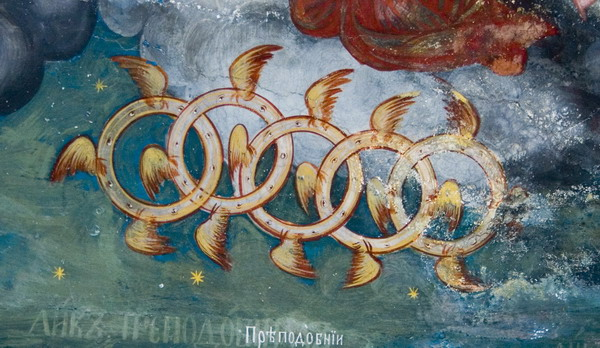
Ezekiel's Wheel in St. John the Baptist Church in Kratovo, North Macedonia. Fresco from the 19th century.

According to the verses in Ezekiel and its attendant commentaries, his vision consists of a chariot made of many heavenly beings driven by the "Likeness of a Man". The base structure of the chariot is composed of four beings. These beings are called the "living creatures" (Hebrew: חיות hayyot or khayyot). The bodies of the creatures are "like that of a human being", but each of them has four faces, corresponding to the four directions the chariot can go (East, South, North and West). The faces are that of a man, a lion, an ox (later changed to a cherub in Ezekiel 10:14) and a vulture. Since there are four angels and each has four faces, there are a total of sixteen faces. Each of the hayyot angels also has four wings. Two of these wings spread across the length of the chariot and connect with the wings of the angel on the other side. This creates a sort of 'box' of wings that forms the perimeter of the chariot. With the remaining two wings, each angel covers its own body. Below, but not attached to, the feet of the hayyot angels are other angels that are shaped like wheels. These wheel angels, which are described as "a wheel inside of a wheel", are called "ophanim" אופנים (lit. wheels, cycles or ways). These wheels are not directly under the chariot but are nearby and along its perimeter. The angel with the face of the man is always on the east side and looks up at the "Likeness of a Man" that drives the chariot. The "Likeness of a Man" sits on a throne made of a substance like "sapphire".

The Bible later makes mention of a third type of angel found in the merkabah called "seraphim" (lit. "burning") angels. These angels appear like flashes of fire continuously ascending and descending. These seraphim angels power the movement of the chariot. In the hierarchy of these angels, hayyoth are the highest, that is, closest to God, followed by the ophanim, which are followed by the seraphim. The chariot is in a constant state of motion, and the energy behind this movement runs according to this hierarchy. The movement of the ophanim is controlled by the "Living creatures", or Hayyot, while the movement of the hayyot is controlled by the seraphim. The movement of all the angels of the chariot is controlled by the "Likeness of a Man" on the Throne.

== Early Jewish merkabah mysticism ==
Mark Verman has distinguished four periods in early Jewish mysticism, developing from Isaiah's and Ezekiel's visions of the Throne/Chariot, to later extant merkabah mysticism texts:

1. 800–500 BCE, mystical elements in Prophetic Judaism such as Ezekiel's chariot
2. Beginning c. 530s BCE, especially 300–100 BCE, Apocalyptic literature mysticism
3. Beginning c. 100 BCE, especially 1–130s CE, early Rabbinic merkabah mysticism referred to briefly in exoteric Rabbinic literature such as the Pardes ascent; also related to early Christian mysticism
4. c. 1–200 CE, continuing till c. 1000 CE, merkabah mystical ascent accounts in the esoteric merkabah-Hekhalot literature

=== Rabbinic commentary ===
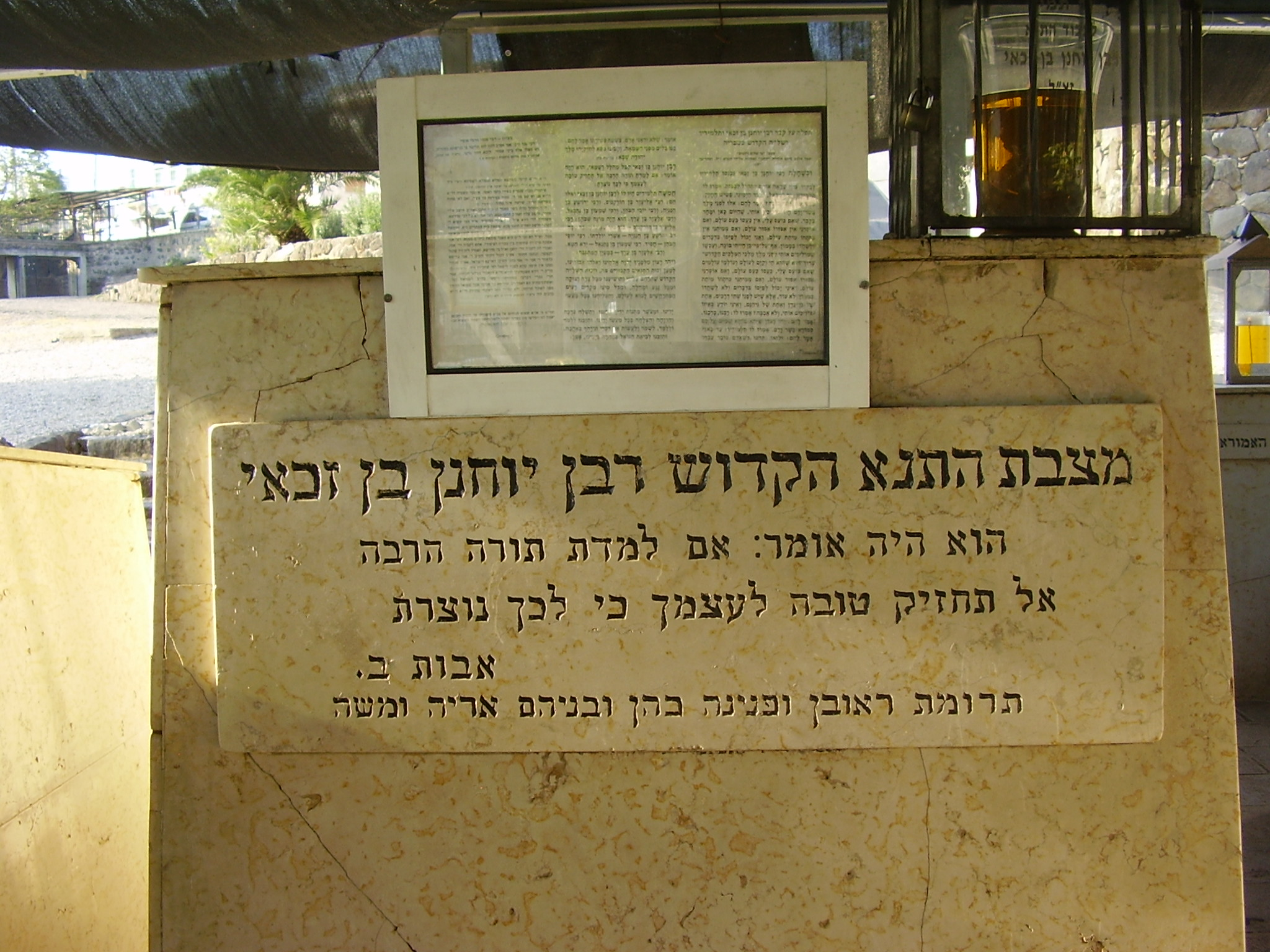
Tomb of Yohanan ben Zakkai in Tiberias

The earliest Rabbinic Merkabah commentaries were exegetical expositions of the prophetic visions of God in the heavens and the divine retinue of angels, hosts, and heavenly creatures surrounding God. The earliest evidence suggests that Merkabah homiletics did not give rise to ascent experiences—as one rabbinic sage states: "Many have expounded upon the merkabah without ever seeing it."

One mention of the Merkabah in the Talmud notes the importance of the passage: "A great issue—the account of the Merkavah; a small issue—the discussions of Abaye and Rava [famous Talmudic sages]." The sages Yohanan ben Zakkai (d. c. 80 CE) and Rabbi Akiva (d. 135) were deeply involved in merkabah exegesis. Rabbi Akiva and his contemporary Ishmael ben Elisha are often the protagonists of later Merkabah ascent literature.

=== Prohibition against study ===
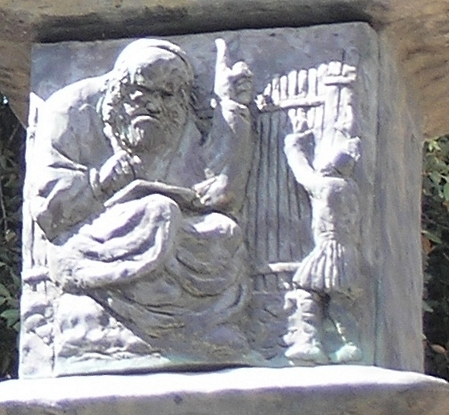
Talmud on the Knesset Menorah. References in rabbinic Talmud and Midrash to merkabah mysticism are brief, avoiding explanation.

The Talmudic interdictions concerning merkabah speculation are numerous and widely held. Discussions concerning the merkabah were limited to only the most worthy sages, and admonitory legends about the dangers of overzealous speculation concerning the merkabah are preserved.

For example, the secret doctrines might not be publicly discussed: "Seek not out the things that are too hard for thee, neither search the things that are above thy strength. But what is commanded thee, think thereupon with reverence; for it is not needful for thee to see with thine eyes the things that are in secret" in Sirach (iii. 21–22). It must be studied only by exemplary scholars: "The Maaseh Bereishit must not be explained before two, nor Ma'aseh Merkabah before one, unless he be wise and understands it by himself," Hagigah ii. 1. Further commentary notes that the chapter-headings of Ma'aseh Merkabah may be taught, as was done by Hiyya bar Abba. According to the Jerusalem Talmud, Hagigah ii. 1, the teacher read the headings of the chapters, after which, subject to the approval of the teacher, the pupil read to the end of the chapter. However, Rabbi Zera said that even the chapter-headings might be communicated only to a person who was head of a school and was cautious in temperament.

According to Rabbi Ammi, the secret doctrine might be entrusted only to one who possessed the five qualities enumerated in Isaiah 3:3 (being experienced in any of five different professions requiring good judgement), and a certain age is, of course, necessary. When Yohanan ben Zakkai wished to initiate Eleazar ben Azariah in the Ma'aseh Merkabah, the latter answered, "I am not yet old enough." A boy who recognized the meaning of חשמל (Ezekiel 1:4) was consumed by fire (Hagigah 13b), and the perils connected with the unauthorized discussion of these subjects are often described (Hagigah ii. 1; Shab. 80b).

=== Jewish development ===
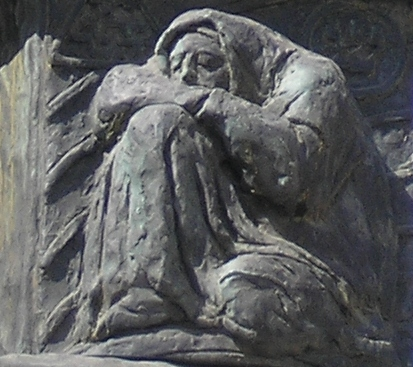
Later Medieval Kabbalah on the Knesset Menorah. Posture similar to earlier "descenders of merkabah", head between knees, also mentioned in the Talmud.

Early apocalyptists associated with Synagogal Judaism and the secessionist lineage of priests engaged in visionary exegeses concerning the divine realm and creatures remarkably similar to the material.

The secessionist priestly literature treated Ezekiel’s Merkavah as a prototype of sacred heavenly space, because the Merkavah was portrayed and interpreted as a visionary, mystical transformation of the Holy of Holies, a composite of details from the Temple which expressed the very essence of the sacred precinct.

A few of the Dead Sea Scrolls indicate that the Qumran community also engaged in Merkabah exegesis. Recently uncovered mystical texts also evidence a deep affinity with merkabah homilies.

The Merkabah homilies eventually consisted of detailed descriptions of multiple-layered heavens, often seven, often guarded by angels and encircled by flames and lightning. The highest heaven contains seven hekhalot "palaces", and in the innermost palace resides a supreme divine image seated on a throne, surrounded by terrifying hosts singing God's praise.

When these images were combined with an actual mystical experiential motif of individual ascent (paradoxically called "descent" in most texts, Yordei Merkabah, "descenders of the chariot", perhaps describing inward contemplation) and union is not precisely known.

=== Maaseh Merkabah ===
Maaseh Merkabah (Work of the Chariot) is the modern name given to a Hekhalot text, discovered by scholar Gershom Scholem. Maaseh Merkabah dates from late Hellenistic period, after the end of the Second Temple period following the destruction of the Second Temple in 70 CE when the physical cult ceased to function. The idea of making a journey to the heavenly hekhal seems to be a kind of spiritualization of the pilgrimages to the earthly hekhal that were now no longer possible. It is a form of pre-Kabbalah Jewish mysticism that teaches both of the possibility of making a sublime journey to God and of the ability of man to draw down divine powers to earth; it seems to have been an esoteric movement that grew out of the priestly mysticism already evident in the Dead Sea Scrolls and some apocalyptic writings (see the studies by Rachel Elior).

Several movements in Jewish mysticism and, later, students of the Kabbalah have focused on these passages from Ezekiel, seeking underlying meaning and the secrets of Creation in what they argued was the metaphoric language of the verses.

Due to the concern of some Torah scholars that misunderstanding these passages as literal descriptions of God's image might lead to blasphemy or idolatry, there was great opposition to studying this topic without the proper initiation. Jewish biblical commentaries emphasize that the imagery of the merkabah is not meant to be taken literally; rather the chariot and its accompanying angels are analogies for the various ways that God reveals himself in this world. Hasidic philosophy and kabbalah discuss at length what each aspect of this vision represents in this world, and how the vision does not imply that God is made up of these forms.

Jews customarily read the Biblical passages concerning the merkabah in the synagogue every year on the holiday of Shavuot, and the merkabah is also referenced in several places in traditional Jewish liturgy.

=== Hekhalot literature ===
The main interests of Hekhalot literature are accounts of divine visions, mystical ascents into heaven and observance of the divine council, and the summoning and control of great angels, usually for the purpose of gaining insight into Torah. The locus classicus for these practices is the biblical accounts of the Chariot vision of Ezekiel and the Temple vision of Isaiah (Chap. 6). It is from these, and from the many extra-canonical apocalyptic writings of heavenly visitations, that hekhalot literature emerges. Still, it is distinctive from both Qumran literature and apocalyptic writings for several reasons, chief among them being that hekhalot literature is not at all interested in eschatology, largely ignores the unique status of the priesthood, has little interest in fallen angels or demonology, and it "democratizes" the possibility of divine ascent.

In their visions, these mystics would enter into the celestial realms and journey through the seven stages of mystical ascent: the Seven Heavens and seven throne rooms. Such a journey is fraught with great danger, and the adept must not only have made elaborate purification preparation, but must also know the proper incantations, seals and angelic names needed to get past the fierce angelic guards, as well as know how to navigate the various forces at work inside and outside the palaces.

This heavenly ascent is accomplished by the recital of hymns, as well as the theurgic use of secret names of God which abound in the Hekhalot literature. The Hekalot Zutarti in particular is concerned with the secret names of God and their powers:

This is His great name, with which Moses divided the great sea:

.בשובר ירברב סגי בדסיקין מרא סחטי בר סאיי לבים

This is His great name which turned the waters into high walls:

אנסיהגמן לכסם נעלם סוסיאל ושברים מרוב און אר אסמוריאל סחריש

בי?ו אנמם כהה יהאל.

At times, heavenly interlocutors will reveal divine secrets. In some texts, the mystic's interest extends to the heavenly music and liturgy, usually connected with the angelic adorations mentioned in Isaiah 6:3. The mantra-like repetitive nature of the liturgies recorded in many of these compositions seems meant to encourage further ascent. The ultimate goal of the ascent varies from text to text. In some cases, it seems to be a visionary glimpse of God, to "Behold the King in His Beauty". Others hint at "enthronement", that the adept be accepted among the angelic retinue of God and be given an honored seat. One text actually envisions the successful pilgrim getting to sit in God's "lap". Scholars such as Peter Schaefer and Elliot Wolfson see an erotic theology implied in this kind of image, though it must be said sexual motifs, while present in highly attenuated forms, are few and far between if one surveys the full scope of the literature.

Literary works related to the Hekhalot tradition that have survived in whole or in part include Hekhalot Rabbati (or Pirkei Hekhalot), Hekhalot Zutarti, 3 Enoch (also known as "Hebrew Enoch"), and Maaseh Merkabah. In addition there are many smaller and fragmentary manuscripts that seem to belong to this genre, but their exact relationship to Maaseh Merkabah mysticism and to each other is often not clear (Dennis, 2007, 199–120).

=== Key texts ===
The ascent texts are extant in four principal works, all redacted well after the third but certainly before the ninth century CE. They are:

1. Hekhalot Zutartey ("The Lesser Palaces"), which details an ascent of Rabbi Akiva;
2. Hekhalot Rabbati ("The Greater Palaces"), which details an ascent of Rabbi Ishmael;
3. Maaseh Merkabah ("Work of the Chariot"), a collection of hymns recited by the "descenders" and heard during their ascent;
4. Sepher Hekhalot ("Book of Palaces", also known as 3 Enoch), which recounts an ascent and divine transformation of the biblical figure Enoch into the archangel Metatron, as related by Rabbi Ishmael.

A fifth work provides a detailed description of the Creator as seen by the "descenders" at the climax of their ascent. This work, preserved in various forms, is called Shi'ur Qomah ("Measurement of the Body"), and is rooted in a mystical exegesis of the Song of Songs, a book reputedly venerated by Rabbi Akiva. The literal message of the work was repulsive to those who maintained God's incorporeality; Maimonides (d. 1204) wrote that the book should be erased and all mention of its existence deleted.

While throughout the era of merkabah mysticism the problem of creation was not of paramount importance, the treatise Sefer Yetzirah ("Book of Formation") represents an attempted cosmogony from within a merkabah milieu. This text was probably composed during the seventh century, and evidence suggests Neoplatonic, Pythagoric, and Stoic influences. It features a linguistic theory of creation in which God creates the universe by combining the 22 letters of the Hebrew alphabet, along with emanations represented by the ten numerals, or sefirot.

Certain key concepts found in the Sefer Yetzirah, such as the "6 directions", are mentioned in the Talmud, and also the title of the book is referenced: yet scholars do not conclude that the versions of the Sefer Yetzirah that have been handed down today are identical to the book which the Talmud references.

=== Hekhalot literature and "Four Entered Pardes" ===
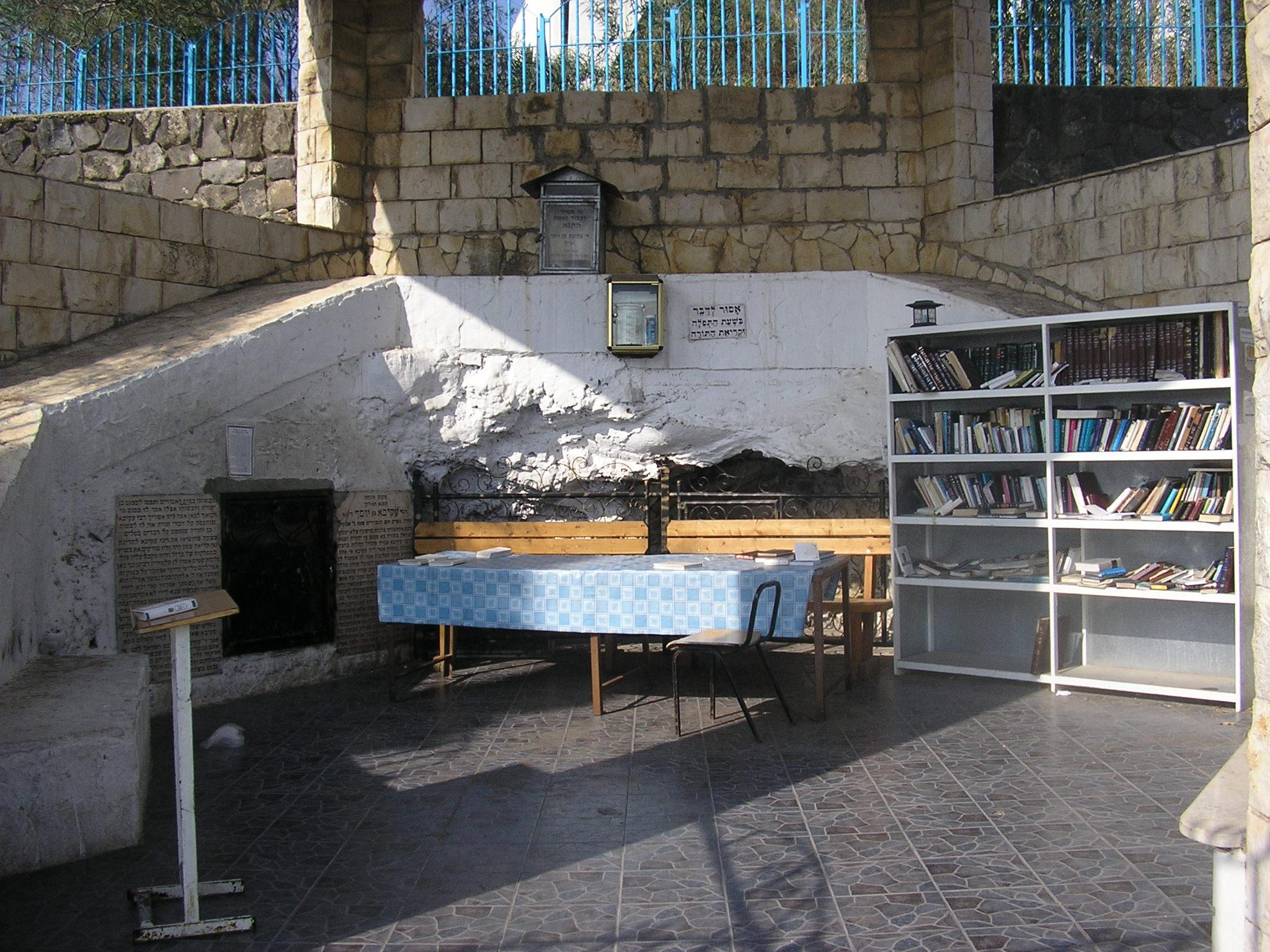
Tomb of Rabbi Akiva in Tiberias, northern Israel

Moshe Idel, Gershom Scholem, Joseph Dan, and others have raised the natural question concerning the relationship between the "chambers" portion of the Hekhalot literature and the Babylonian Talmud's treatment of "The Work of the Chariot" in the presentation and analysis of such in the Gemara to tractate Hagigah of the Mishna. This portion of the Babylonian Talmud, which includes the famous "four entered pardes" material, runs from 12b-iv (wherein the Gemara's treatment of the "Work of Creation" flows into and becomes its treatment of "The Work of the Chariot") to and into 16a-i. (All references are to the ArtScroll pagination.)

By making use of the Rabbinically paradigmatic figures of Rabbi Akiva and Rabbi Ishmael in their writings, the generators of the Hekhalot literature, quite arguably, seem to be attempting to show some sort of connection between their writings and the Chariot/Throne study and practice of the Rabbinic Movement in the decades immediately following upon the destruction of the Temple. However, in both the Jerusalem Talmud and the Babylonian Talmud the major players in this Chariot/Throne endeavor are, clearly, Rabbi Akiva and Elisha ben Abuyah who is referred to as "Akher". Neither Talmud presents Rabbi Ishmael as a player in merkabah study and practice.

In the long study on these matters contained in "'The Written' as the Vocation of Conceiving Jewishly" (McGinley, J W; 2006) the hypothesis is offered and defended that "Rabbi Ishmael ben Elisha" (more often, simply "Rabbi Ishmael") is in fact a Rabbinically sanctioned cognomen for Elisha ben Abuyah who apostatized from the Rabbinic Movement. The argument is that through this indirection Rabbinic officialdom was able to integrate into the Gemaric give and take of argumentation and analysis the huge body of halakhic and hermeneutical teachings of this great Torah scholar without, however, honoring his equally significant apostasy. To be sure, in the accounting of this figure's mystical study and practice the pejorative (in context) "Akher" is used instead of "Rabbi Ishmael". This is because Elisha ben Abuyah's teachings under the heading of "The Work of the Chariot" came to be considered heretical in contrast to his halakhic and hermeneutical teachings which were generally admired—and whose weighty influence, in any case, could not be ignored. All of this indicates that the generators of the Hekhalot literature were indeed savvy in choosing "Rabbi Ishmael" as paradigmatic in their own writings as a means of relating their own endeavors to the mystical study and practices of the tannaim in the early decades following upon the destruction of the Temple.

Both Akiva and the "Ishmaelic Akher" traded upon the "two-thrones"/"two-powers"-in-Heaven motif in their respective merkabah-oriented undertakings. Akiva's version is memorialized in the Babylonian Gemara to tractate Hagigah at 14a-ii wherein Akiva puts forth the pairing of God and "David" in a messianic version of that mystical motif. Immediately after this Akivian "solution" to the puzzle of thrones referred to in Song of Songs and the two thrones spoken of in Daniel, Chapter 7, the text presents Akiva as being pressured—and then acquiescing to—a domesticated version of this twoness theme for the single Jewish God which would be acceptable to Rabbinic officialdom. The text offers Justice [din] and Charity (ts'daqqa) as the middot of God which are enthroned in Heaven. (Again, 14a-ii) Akher's non-Messianic and Metatron-oriented version of this "two-thrones"/"two-powers"-in-Heaven motif is discussed at length in the entry "Paradigmatia" of the above-mentioned study. The generic point in all of this is that by the time of the final editing of the Mishna this whole motif (along with other dimensions of merkabah-oriented study and practice) came to be severely discouraged by Rabbinic officialdom. Those who still pursued these kinds of things were marginalized by the Rabbinic Movement over the next several centuries becoming, in effect, a separate grouping responsible for the Hekhalot literature.

In the "four-entered-pardes" section of this portion of the Babylonian Gemara on tractate Hagigah, it is the figure of Akiva who seems to be lionized. For of the four he is the only one presented who ascended and descended "whole". The other three were broken, one way or another: Ben Azzai dies soon after; Ben Zoma is presented as going insane; and worst of all, "Akher" apostatizes. This putative lionization of Rabbi Akiva occurs at 15b-vi-16a-i of our Gemara section.

== The merkabah in later Jewish interpretations ==
=== Maimonides' explanation ===
Maimonides' philosophical 12th-century work Guide for the Perplexed is in part intended as an explanation of the passages Ma'aseh Bereshit and Ma'aseh Merkabah. In the third volume, Maimonides commences the exposition of the mystical passage of the mystic doctrines found in the merkabah passages, while justifying this "crossing of the line" from hints to direct instruction. Maimonides explains basic mystical concepts via the Biblical terms referring to Spheres, elements and Intelligences. In these chapters, however, there is still very little in terms of direct explanation.

We have frequently mentioned in this treatise the principle of our Sages "not to discuss the Maaseh Merkabah even in the presence of one pupil, except he be wise and intelligent; and then only the headings of the chapters are to be given to him." We must, therefore, begin with teaching these subjects according to the capacity of the pupil, and on two conditions, first, that he be wise, i.e., that he should have successfully gone through the preliminary studies, and secondly that he be intelligent, talented, clear-headed, and of quick perception, that is, "have a mind of his own", as our Sages termed it.

— Guide for the Perplexed, ch. XXXIII

=== The Four Worlds of Kabbalah ===
Kabbalah relates the Merkabah vision of Ezekiel and the Throne vision of Isaiah (Isaiah 6:1–8) describing the seraph angels, to its comprehensive Four Worlds. The highest World, Atziluth ("Emanation"—Divine wisdom), is the realm of absolute Divine manifestation without self-awareness, metaphorically described in the vision as the likeness of a Man on the throne. The throne of sapphire is an etymological root in Kabbalah for the Sephirot divine powers. The second World, Beriah ("Creation"—Divine understanding), is the first independent root creation, the realm of the Throne, denoting God descending into Creation, as a king limits his true greatness and revealed posture when seated. The World of Beriah is the realm of the higher angels, the Seraphim ("burning" in ascent and descent as their understanding of God motivates self-annihilation). The third World, Yetzirah ("Formation"—Divine emotions), is the realm of archetypal existence, the abode of the main Hayyot angels ("alive" with divine emotion). They are described with faces of a lion, ox and eagle, as their emotional nature is instinctive like animals, and they are the archetypal origins of creatures in this World. The lowest World, Assiah ("Action"—Divine rulership), is the realm guided by the lower channels of the Ophanim (humble "ways" in realised creation).

The Rabbinic Talmud compares Ezekiel and Isaiah's visions of God's Chariot-Throne, noticing that Ezekiel gives a lengthy account of details, while Isaiah is very brief. It gives an exoteric explanation for this; Isaiah prophesied in the era of Solomon's Temple, Ezekiel's vision took place in the exile of Babylonian captivity. Rava states in the Babylonian Talmud that although Ezekiel describes the appearance of the throne of God, this is not because he had seen more than Isaiah, but rather because the latter was more accustomed to such visions; for the relation of the two prophets is that of a courtier to a peasant, the latter of whom would always describe a royal court more floridly than the former, to whom such things would be familiar. Ezekiel, like all prophets except Moses, has beheld only a blurred reflection of the divine majesty, just as a poor mirror reflects objects only imperfectly.

The Kabbalistic account explains this difference in terms of the Four Worlds. All prophecy emanates from the divine chokmah (wisdom) realm of Atziluth. However, in order to be perceived it descends to be enclothed in vessels of lower Worlds. Isaiah's prophecy saw the merkabah in the World of Beriah divine understanding, restraining his explanation by realising the inadequacy of description. Ezekiel saw the merkabah in the lower World of Yetzirah divine emotions, causing him to describe the vision in rapturous detail.

The two visions also form the Kedushah Jewish daily liturgy:

We will sanctify Thy name in the world even as they sanctify it in the highest heavens, as it is written by the hand of Thy prophet: "And they (the Seraphim) called one unto the other and said, Holy, holy, holy is the Lord of Hosts; the whole earth is full of His glory."

— Isaiah 6:3

Those over against them (the Hayyot) say, Blessed: "Blessed be the glory of the Lord from His place."

— Ezekiel 3:12

And in Thy holy words it is written, saying: "The Lord shall reign forever, thy God, O Zion, unto all generations; Hallelujah."

— Psalm 146:10

According to the Kabbalistic explanation, the Seraphim ("burning" angels) in Beriah (divine understanding) realise their distance from the absolute divinity of Atziluth. Their call, "Holy", repeated three times, means removed or separated. This causes their "burning up" continual self-nullification, ascending to God and returning to their place. Their understanding realises instead that God's true purpose (glory) for creation is with lowly man. The lower Hayyot ("living" angels) in Yetzirah (divine emotions) say, "Blessed [etymologically in Kabbalah "drawing down" blessing] be the glory ... from His [distant-unknown to them] place" of Atziluth. Though lower than the Seraphim, their emotional self-awareness has a superior advantage of powerful desire. This causes them to be able to draw down divine vitality from a higher source, the supreme realm of Atziluth, to lower creation and man. In Ezekiel's vision, the Hayyot have a central role in the merkabah's channeling of the divine flow in creation.

=== Hasidic explanation ===
Hasidic thought explains Kabbalah in terms of human psychology. Through this, the merkabah is a multi-layered analogy that offers insight into the nature of man, the ecosystem, the world, and teaches self-refinement.

The four Hayyot angels represent the basic archetypes that God used to create the current nature of the world. Ophanim, which means "ways", are the ways these archetypes combine to create actual entities that exist in the world. For instance, in the basic elements of the world, the lion represents fire, the ox/earth, the man/water, and the eagle/air. However, in practice, everything in the world is some combination of all four, and the particular combination of each element that exist in each thing are its particular Ophanim or ways.

The 'man on the throne' in the vision of Ezekiel descriptively represents God, who is controlling everything that goes on in the world, and how all of the archetypes He set up should interact. The 'man on the throne', however, drives when the four angels connect their wings. This means that God will not be revealed to us by us looking at all four elements (for instance) as separate and independent entities. However, when one looks at the way that earth, wind, fire and water (for instance) which all oppose each other are able to work together and coexist in complete harmony in the world, this shows that there is really a higher power (God) telling these elements how to act.

This very lesson carries over to explain how the four basic groups of animals and the four basic archetypal philosophies and personalities reveal a higher, Godly source when one is able to read between the lines and see how these opposing forces can and do interact in harmony. A person should strive to be like a Merkaba, that is to say, he should realize all the different qualities, talents and inclinations he has (his angels). They may seem to contradict, but when one directs his life to a higher goal such as doing God's will he (the man on the chair driving the chariot) will see how they all can work together and even complement each other. Ultimately, we should strive to realize how all of the forces in the world, though they may seem to conflict, can unite when one knows how to use them all to fulfill a higher purpose; namely to serve God.

== Parallels in early Christianity ==
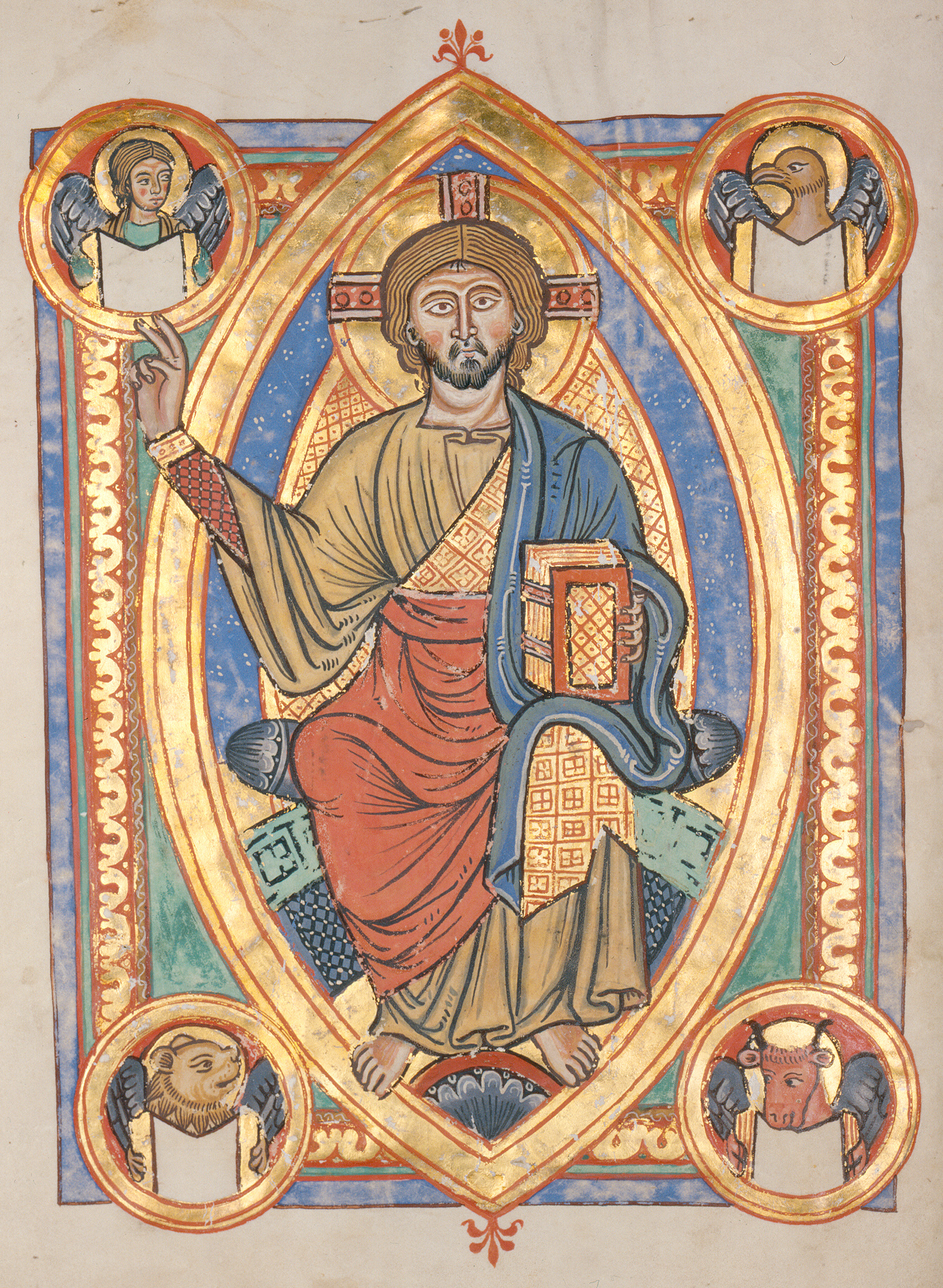
Christian depiction of the four living creatures (man, lion, ox, and eagle) as symbols of the Four Evangelists (in corners)

According to Timo Eskola, early Christian theology and discourse was influenced by the Jewish merkabah tradition. Similarly, biblical scholars Alan Segal and Daniel Boyarin regard Paul the Apostle's account of his conversion experience and his ascent to the Heavens (2 Corinthians 12:2–4) as the earliest first-person literary account of a merkabah mystic in Jewish or Christian literature. Timothy Churchill has argued that Paul's conversion on the road to Damascus (Acts 9:1–9) does not fit the pattern of merkabah mysticism, but this experience is not described in the letters of Paul, and the Book of Acts does not claim to be a first-person account (Acts 1:1–2; Luke 1:1–4).

According to biblical scholar Garrett Evan Best, the vision of Ezekiel influenced the apocalyptic themes and mythology of the Book of Revelation in the New Testament. The prophetic and symbolic vocabulary of John in Revelation 1:13–20 and Revelation 4:1–11 evidently refers to the vision of the merkabah or heavenly throne of God borrowed from Ezekiel 1. In Christian art and iconography, the four living creatures (man, lion, ox, and eagle) are used as symbols for the Four Evangelists, and appear frequently in church decorations: the lion represents Mark, the ox Luke, the man Matthew, and the eagle John. These creatures are called Zoë or the Tetramorph, and surround the throne of God in Heaven, along with twenty-four elders and seven spirits of God (according to Revelation 4:1–11).

== See also ==
=== Religion, philosophy, mysticism ===
- Babylonian captivity
- Bearers of the Throne
- Cherubim
- Development of the Hebrew Bible canon
- Elijah's chariot of fire
- Four living creatures
- God in Judaism
- Jewish angelic hierarchy
- Maaseh Breishit and Maaseh Merkavah
- Moshe Chaim Luzzatto
- Muraqabah
- Practical Kabbalah
- Quadriga
- Solar chariot
- Theophany
- Vimana

=== Ancient astronaut theories ===
- Chariots of the Gods?, 1968 pseudoarchaeological text written by Erich von Däniken
- The Spaceships of Ezekiel, 1974 pseudoscientific text written by Josef F. Blumrich

=== Science fiction ===
- Contact, 1997 science-fiction drama film directed by Robert Zemeckis
- Knowing, 2009 science-fiction thriller film directed by Alex Proyas
- Project U.F.O., American science-fiction television series (1978–1979)

=== Other ===
- "Ezekiel Airship", experimental aircraft inspired by and named after the Book of Ezekiel
- "Ezekiel Saw the Wheel", African-American spiritual song based on the vision of Ezekiel
- "Merkava", an IDF main battle tank, named after a more literal interpretation of the Hebrew word meaning "chariot"

== Sources ==
- - Jacobs, Joseph; Biram, A. "Ma'aseh Bereshit; Ma'aseh Merkabah". The Jewish Encyclopedia.
  - Kohler, Kaufmann. "Merkabah". The Jewish Encyclopedia.
- Dennis, Geoffrey W. (2007). The Encyclopedia of Jewish Myth, Magic, and Mysticism (1st illustrated ed.). United States: Llewellyn Worldwide. ISBN 978-0-7387-0905-5.
- Dennis, Geoffrey W. (Spring 2008). "The Use of Water as a Medium for Altered States of Consciousness in Early Jewish Mysticism: A Cross-Disciplinary Analysis". Anthropology of Consciousness. 19 (1): 84–106. doi:10.1111/j.1556-3537.2008.00004.x.
- Elior, Rachel (2005). The Three Temples: On the Emergence of Jewish Mysticism (reprint ed.). United Kingdom: Littman Library of Jewish Civilization. ISBN 978-1-904113-33-1.
- Karr, Don (2022). "Notes on the Study of Merkabah Mysticism and Hekhalot Literature in English" (PDF). Archived (PDF) from the original on 2024-01-19.
- Scholem, Gershom G. Jewish Gnosticism, Merkabah Mysticism, and Talmudic Tradition.
- Scholem, Gershom G. (1987). Werblowsky, R. J. Zwi (ed.). Origins of the Kabbalah (1st illustrated reprint ed.). Israel: Jewish Publication Society. ISBN 978-0-691-07314-9.
