= Maaseh Breishit and Maaseh Merkavah =

Talmudic terms for the esoteric doctrine of the universe

Ma'aseh Breishit (Hebrew: מַעֲשֶׂה בְּרֵאשִׁית) and Ma'aseh Merkavah (מַעֲשֶׂה מֶרְכָּבָה), literally "work in the Beginning" and "work of the Chariot", are terms used in the Talmud for the esoteric doctrine of the universe, or for parts of it.

Ma'aseh Bereshit, following the Genesis creation narrative, comprises the cosmogony of the Talmudic era; Ma'aseh Merkavah, based on the throne-chariot of Ezekiel 1 and other prophetic descriptions of divine manifestations like Isaiah 6, is concerned with the theosophic views of those times.

== Rules regarding study ==
The secret doctrine may not be discussed in public. The Book of Sirach inveighs against its study: "Seek not out the things that are too hard for thee, neither search the things that are above thy strength. But what is commanded thee, think thereupon with reverence; for it is not needful for thee to see with thine eyes the things that are in secret." The Mishnah says: "Ma'aseh Bereshit must not be explained before two, nor Ma'aseh Merkavah before one, unless he be wise and understands it by himself"; The Talmud then goes on to explain that the chapter-headings of Ma'aseh Merkavah may be taught, as was done by Hiyya bar Abba. According to the Jerusalem Talmud Hagigah 2:1, the teacher read the headings of the chapters, after which, subject to the approval of the teacher, the pupil read to the end of the chapter. Zeira said that even the chapter-headings might be communicated only to a person who was head of a school and was cautious in temperament. According to Rabbi Ammi, the secret doctrine may be entrusted only to one who possesses the five qualities enumerated in Isaiah 3:3.

A certain age is, of course, necessary. When Johanan bar Nappaha wished to initiate Eliezer ben Hurcanus in the Ma'aseh Merkavah, the latter answered, "I am not yet old enough." A boy who recognized the meaning of חשמל (Ezekiel 1:4) was consumed by fire, and the perils connected with the unauthorized discussion of these subjects are often described.

== Maaseh Breishit ==
Hagigah 11b states that it is permissible to inquire concerning the events of the six days of Creation, but not regarding what happened before the Creation. In no case, then, is the entire cosmogony included in the term "Ma'aseh Bereshit," but only its more mystic aspects, nor can all the passages of the Talmud and the Midrash dealing with these problems be considered as parts of the doctrine. Thus, ideas like those regarding the ten agencies by means of which God created the world, or questions as to whether heaven or earth was first created, or concerning the foundations of the world, or as to whether there are two heavens or seven (all these problems being mentioned in connection with the interdiction against teaching the Ma'aseh Bereshit to more than one person), do not belong to the doctrine itself, for such arguments are forbidden by the dictum, "You may speak of the seven heavens, but of the things after it you may not speak." The views which are found scattered throughout the Talmud, and especially in Genesis Rabbah 1-12, are generally aggadic in character; indeed the question arises whether anything more than mere allusions may be expected therein regarding Ma'aseh Bereshit, in so far as it is esoteric in content. Some information seems to be given, though only by intimation, in the story of the four scholars that entered paradise (that is, penetrated the mysteries of the secret doctrine), of whom only R. Akiva remained uninjured. R. Akiva's words at the beginning of the story, "When you reach the shining marble stone do not cry out 'Water, water,'" seem to point to those theories of Creation which assume water to be the original element.

Ben Yoma is represented as interested in the determination of the space between the upper and lower waters. Hagigah 2:1 also indicates this in the story of R. Judah b. Pazzi, who opened his discourse on Ma'aseh Bereshit with the words, "In the beginning the world was water in water." Thus, the question of the primal elements undoubtedly belongs to this field. Here again, one must distinguish aggadic and devotional from mystic and philosophical thought, and must not teach views such as that the world was created out of "tohu" and "bohu" and "hoshekh," or that air, wind, and storm were the primal elements, as component parts of the doctrine of Creation. Similarly, the cosmogonic conceptions of the Apocrypha and of geonic mysticism must not be considered as indications of the secret teachings of the Ma'aseh Bereshit.

== Maaseh Merkavah ==
Somewhat simpler is the question regarding the nature of the Ma'aseh Merkavah, which is designated as "an important matter" in the Talmud, and which, perhaps, occupies on the whole a more prominent position than the Ma'aseh Bereshit. Just as in the case of the latter, the purely aggadic explanations of Ezekiel 1 (as found, for instance, in Hagigah 13b) must not be taken into consideration. It is declared that this chapter of Ezekiel may be studied even by young pupils, because a boy can seldom recognize the doctrines implied in it. The object, therefore, was to find special secrets in these verses. Rabbi Akiva is said to have gathered his mystic deductions from Deuteronomy 33:2 ("and he came with ten thousands of saints"), Song of Songs 5:10 ("the chiefest among ten thousand"), Isaiah 48:2 ("The Lord of hosts is his name"), and I Kings 19:11,12 (Elijah's great theophany). The Ma'aseh Merkavah, therefore, dealt with esoteric teachings concerning the visible manifestations of God, and hence with angelology and demonology, though not to the same degree as in Talmudic literature. As the story of R. Akiva indicates, the other theophanies mentioned in the Bible were used in the Ma'aseh Merkavah; Ḥag. 13b shows, e.g., that this was the case with Isaiah 6.

== Practical Applications ==
Ma'aseh Merkavah seems to have had practical applications. The belief was apparently current that certain mystic expositions of the Ezekiel chapter, or the discussion of objects connected with it, would cause God to appear. When R. Eleazar ben Arach was discoursing upon the Ma'aseh Merkavah to R. Yohanan ben Zakkai, the latter dismounted from his donkey, saying, "It is not seemly that I sit on the ass while you are discoursing on the heavenly doctrine, and while the Divinity is among us and ministering angels accompany us." Then a fire came down from heaven and surrounded all the trees of the field, whereupon all of them together began to recite the hymn of praise. R. Yose HaKohen and his companion had similar experiences. The belief in the appearance of God is indicated also in the popular idea that all who inquire into the mysteries of the Ma'aseh Merkavah without being duly authorized will die a sudden death. Such a divine interposition is expressly mentioned in connection with the "story of the Creation" in Sanhedrin 95b. Rab Hananiah and Rab Hoshaiah studied the Sefer Yetzirah and the "Hilkhot Yetzirah" respectively every Sabbath evening and succeeded in creating a calf as large as a three-year-old ox.

This esoteric tendency must have led often to pessimistic and nihilistic views, as is shown by the accounts of Elisha ben Abuyah and the Mishnaic passage, "He who speaks of the things which are before, behind, above, and below, it were better he had never been born."

According to a tradition handed down by Jose b. Judah, a tanna of the second half of the second century, Yochanan ben Zakkai was the founder of the secret doctrine. In the same passage, in both Talmuds, it is said, however, that he refused to discuss it, even in the presence of a single person, although, as already stated, R. Eleazar ben Arach discoursed on it with him and was extravagantly praised by him; two other pupils of his, R. Joshua and R. Jose ha-Kohen, also discussed it with him. According to tradition, the second one to give instruction in these matters was R. Joshua, vice-president of the Sanhedrin under R. Gamaliel. He was succeeded by R. Akiva, and the last to teach them was R. Neḥunya ben ha-Ḳanah. R. Jose the Galilean and Pappus discussed the subject with R. Akiva. The tradition, quoted above, of the four who studied the secret doctrine mentions, besides Akiva, Simeon ben Azzai, Simeon ben Zoma, and Elisha ben Abuyah. The fate of the last-named, who was driven from Judaism by his experience, is said to have given rise to restrictive measures. The study of profane books was forbidden, and an interdiction of the public discussion of these subjects was issued, only R. Ishmael objecting. In the time of R. Judah, R. Judah b. Pazzi and Bar Ḳappara delivered public discourses on these mysteries. R. Levi regarding this as inadmissible, R. Ḥiyya declared that the chapter-headings might be taught. R. Judah ha-Nasi was at this time the authority to whom, as formerly to R. Johanan, such matters were referred. In later times the interdiction against public discussions of the story of the Creation was accepted without protest, but by way of warning this saying of Resh Laḳish was added: "His eyes shall be dull who looketh on three things—the rainbow [because it resembles Ezekiel's vision], the king [because he resembles God in majesty], and the priest [because he utters the name of God]."

== Source of Doctrines ==
This Talmudic doctrine may well be connected with the old Jewish esoteric teachings of the time of the Second Temple, as partly preserved in the Apocrypha and the pseudepigrapha. But the theosophic and cosmogonic portions of this literature cannot with certainty be regarded as the source of the Talmudic doctrine. Nor can the literature of the so-called geonic mysticism, crystallized in the Ma'aseh Bereshit and the Ma'aseh Merkavah and designated in its literary form by these names, be regarded as the immediate continuation of Talmudic mysticism. Although much of the material found in the former may belong to the Talmud, yet the entire doctrine of the heavenly halls, angelology, and the doctrine of the Creation as it is found, for instance, in Sefer Yetzirah, must not be regarded as Talmudic in origin. The very fact that there are so many Talmudic and midrashic parallels to the conceptions of the geonic period leads to the conclusion that they contain only a limited amount of original material from the ancient esoteric teachings.

== Later interpretation ==
In the Medieval period, alternative views developed of the esoteric meanings of Judaism. Maimonides interprets Ma'aseh Bereshit as referring to, or prepared by, Aristotelian physics and Ma'aseh Merkavah as referring to an Aristotelian philosophical metaphysics basis for understanding Divine Providence in terms of God's Attributes of Action. Due to the vicissitudes of history, Aristotle's profound intellect had rediscovered this ancient Judaic wisdom. In contrast, Theosophic Kabbalah ("Received Tradition") interpreted their mythic, dynamic psychological drama of God's Persona attributes, and their mutual influence by Man, as the meaning of these secret doctrines of the Torah.

== See also ==
- Merkabah mysticism
- Pardes (legend)
- Pardes (exegesis)
- Hekhalot literature
