= Simeon ben Zoma =

Late 1st / early 2nd century tanna

Simeon ben Zoma, also known as Simon ben Zoma, Shimon ben Zoma or simply Ben Zoma (Hebrew: בן זומא), was a tanna of the 1st and 2nd centuries CE. His name is used without the title "Rabbi" because, like Ben Azzai, he died at a young age, remaining in the grade of "pupil" and never receiving semikhah (rabbinical ordination). Ben Zoma and Ben Azzai are often mentioned together as distinguished representatives of this class. Like Ben Azzai, also, he seems to have belonged to the inner circle of Joshua ben Hananiah's disciples, and a halakhic controversy between them is reported in which Ben Zoma was the victor.

== Esoteric contemplation ==
Ben Zoma was specially noted as an interpreter of the Hebrew Bible; Sotah 9:15 states, "With Ben Zoma died the last of the exegetes" ("darshanim").

The principal subject of Ben Zoma's exegetic research was the first chapter of the Book of Genesis. One of his questions on this chapter, in which he took exception to the phrase in verse 7, "God made", has been handed down by the Judean aggadists (though without the answer), with the remark, "This is one of the Biblical passages by which Ben Zoma created a commotion all over the world". An interpretation of the second verse of the same chapter has been handed down in a tannaitic tradition, together with the following anecdote: Joshua ben Hananiah was walking one day, when he met Ben Zoma, who was about to pass him without greeting. Thereupon Joshua asked: "Whence and whither, Ben Zoma?" The latter replied: "I was lost in thoughts concerning the account of the Creation." And then he told Joshua his interpretation of Genesis 1:2. When speaking to his disciples on the matter, Joshua said, "Ben Zoma is outside," meaning thereby that Ben Zoma had passed beyond the limit of permitted research according to Hagiga 2:5,6 and 15a.

Ben Zoma was one of the four who entered into the garden of esoteric knowledge (see the Pardes legend). It was said of him that he beheld the secrets of the garden and "was struck" with mental aberration according to Hagiga 14b. The disciples of Rabbi Akiva applied to the limitless theosophic speculations, for which Ben Zoma had to suffer, the words of Proverbs 25:16, "If you find honey, eat only what you need, / Lest, surfeiting yourself, you throw it up." according to Hagiga 2:5,6 and l.c.; see also Midrash Mishlei on 25:16.

The Pardes legend allowed the rabbinate to examine Christian claims and Greek philosophical ideas while formulating the talmudic tradition although the subject never completed his ordination. Conversion to Christianity was the result of the subject's alleged insanity according to Samson H. Levey.

== Halachic teachings ==
Ben Zoma's erudition in the halakhah became proverbial, for it was said, "Whoever sees Ben Zoma in his dream is assured of scholarship".

Only a few of Ben Zoma's exegetic teachings have been preserved. The most widely known of these is his interpretation of the phrase, "that you may remember the day when you came forth out of Egypt" to prove that the recitation of the biblical passage referring to the Exodus is obligatory for the evening prayer as well as for the morning prayer. This interpretation, quoted with praise by Eleazar ben Azariah, has found a place in the Haggadah for the Passover night.

In a halakhic interpretation, Ben Zoma explains the word "naḳi" (clean) in Exodus 21:28 by referring to the usage of the word in everyday life.

== Aggadah ==
Ben Zoma, seeing the crowds on the Temple Mount, said,

Ben Zoma once saw a multitude [okhlosa] of Israel while standing on a stair on the Temple Mount. He immediately recited: Blessed… Who knows all secrets and Blessed… Who created all these to serve me. Explaining his custom, he would say: How much effort did Adam the first man exert before he found bread to eat: He plowed, sowed, reaped, sheaved, threshed, winnowed in the wind, separated the grain from the chaff, ground the grain into flour, sifted, kneaded, and baked and only thereafter he ate. And I, on the other hand, wake up and find all of these prepared for me. Human society employs a division of labor, and each individual benefits from the service of the entire world. Similarly, how much effort did Adam the first man exert before he found a garment to wear? He sheared, laundered, combed, spun and wove, and only thereafter he found a garment to wear. And I, on the other hand, wake up and find all of these prepared for me. Members of all nations, merchants and craftsmen, diligently come to the entrance of my home, and I wake up and find all of these before me.

— Berakhot 58a:4

In the closing words of Ecclesiastes, "for this is the whole man," he found the thought expressed, that the pious man is the crown and end of mankind; the whole race ("the whole world") was created only to be of service to him who fears God and respects His commandments.

=== Quotes ===
- Ben Zoma would say:

Who is wise? He who learns from everyone. As is stated: "From all my teachers I have grown wise";
Who is strong? He who controls his impulses. As is stated: "Better one who is slow to anger than one with might, one who rules his spirit than the captor of a city.";
Who is rich? He who is happy with what he has. As is stated: "If you eat of toil of your hands, fortunate are you, and good is to you"; "fortunate are you" in this world, "and good is to you" in the World to Come;
Who is honored? He who honors everyone! As is stated: "For to those who honor me, I accord honor; those who scorn me shall be demeaned;"

- A grateful guest says, "That host be remembered for good! How many wines he brought up before me; how many portions he placed before me; how many cakes he offered me! All that he did, he did for my sake." But the ill-willed guest says, "What did I eat of his? A piece of bread, a bite of meat. What did I drink? A cup of wine. Whatever he did, he did for the sake of his wife and his children." Thus the Scripture says, "Remember that thou magnify His work, whereof men have sung."
- If you, in repentance, have been ashamed in this world, you will not need to be ashamed before God in the next.
