= Yose HaKohen =

2nd-century rabbi

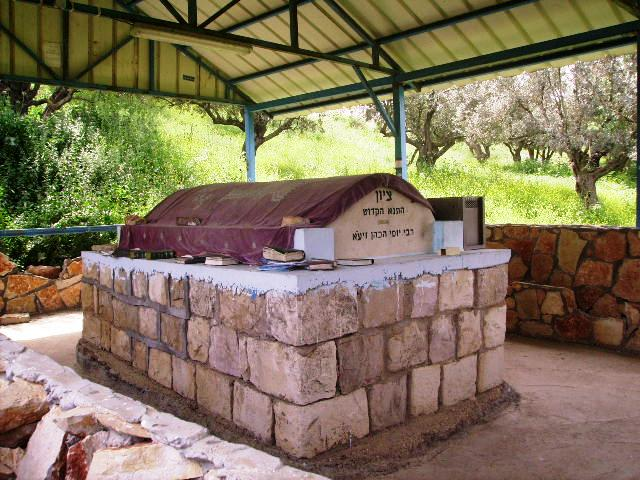
Grave of Rabbi Yose Hacohen

Rabbi Yose Hacohen (Jose ha-cohen, Yosei the priest; Hebrew: רבי יוסי הכהן) was a second-generation Tanna who lived at the end of the first century CE, a student of Rabban Yohanan ben Zakkai.

His Halakhic opinion is only mentioned once in the Mishnah. The Talmud says about him that he learned Maaseh Merkabah with Rabbi Joshua ben Hananiah, and that his teacher, Rabban Yohanan ben Zakkai, praised his knowledge of Kabbalistic wisdom.

The Mishnah relates that his teacher and colleagues referred to him as "pious" ("hasid"). Some identify him with Rabbi Yose Katnuta ("the Small"), about whom the Mishna states: "When Rabbi Yosei the Small died, that was the end of the pious." Some claim that the reason he appears so rarely in the Mishna is because of his humility. The Talmud says of him that he was so careful about the laws of Shabbat that, "a document in his handwriting was never found in the hand of a gentile," to prevent even a gentile from transgressing Shabbat by carrying his letter in a public place.

Rabbi Yose also appears as a Biblical commentator, when he explained difficult verses before Rabban Gamaliel, and as an ethical teacher of Musar when he was asked by his teacher, Rabban Yohanan ben Zakkai, "Which is the straight path that a person should cleave to?" Rabbi Yose answered, "A good neighbor." To the converse question, of "What is the wicked path that a person should distance himself from?" he answered, "A bad neighbor." He is also mentioned as someone who comforted Rabban Yohanan ben Zakkai after the death of his son.

Mordecai Margalioth claims that Rabbi Yosi Hacohen should not be confused with Rabbi Yosef Hacohen, who is mentioned in the Mishna but was not one of the sages.

== Burial place ==
There is a supposed grave of Rabbi Yose HaKohen in Alma, though it is also claimed that he was buried near Rabban Yohanan ben Zakkai in Tiberias. Local residents mark the anniversary of his death (Yom Hillula) on 15th of Iyar.
