= Pardes (legend) =

Jewish legend about the "orchard" of esoteric knowledge

Pardes (Hebrew: פַּרְדֵּס pardēs, "orchard") is the subject of a Jewish aggadah ("legend") about four rabbis of the Mishnaic period (1st century CE) who entered the pardes (the "orchard" of esoteric Torah knowledge), only one of them succeeded in leaving the pardes unharmed.

The basic story goes as follows:

Four entered the orchard: Ben Azzai, Ben Zoma, Acher (i.e., Elisha ben Avuya), and Rabbi Akiva. One looked and died. One looked and was harmed. One looked and cut down the trees. And one went up in peace and went down in peace.

— Babylonian Talmud, Tosefta Hagigah 2.2

Sources differ concerning which sage died and which became demented; the Tosefta and the Babylonian Talmud say ben Azzai died and ben Zoma became demented, but the Jerusalem Talmud, Shir HaShirim Rabbah, and the hekhalot literature record the reverse.

== Etymology ==
The Hebrew word פַּרְדֵּס (pardes, "orchard") is of Persian origin (cf Avestan 𐬞𐬀𐬌𐬭𐬌⸱𐬛𐬀𐬉𐬰𐬀) and appears several times in the Bible. The same Old Persian root is the source of the word paradise via Latin paradisus and Greek παράδεισος, which were used for פרדס's Biblical Hebrew equivalent גן, Garden, in early Bible translations.

Samson Levey proposed the Greek paradosis suggests the four were examining the claims and early documents of Christianity and that the Tosefta account preserves the scholarly undertaking most accurately.

== Versions ==
The story is found in several places, with minor variations: the Tosefta, the Babylonian Talmud, and the Jerusalem Talmud. The earliest context, found in the Tosefta, is the restriction on transmitting mystical teaching concerning the divine Chariot except privately to particularly qualified disciples.

The sugya in the Babylonian Talmud, at Hagigah 14b, is the best-known:

The Rabbis taught: Four entered the Pardes. They were Ben Azzai, Ben Zoma, Acher and Rabbi Akiva. Rabbi Akiva said to them, "When you come to the place of pure marble stones, do not say, 'Water! Water!' for it is said, 'He who speaks untruths shall not stand before My eyes'". Ben Azzai gazed and died. Regarding him the verse states, 'Precious in the eyes of G-d is the death of His pious ones'. Ben Zoma gazed and was harmed (also trans. went mad). Regarding him the verse states, 'Did you find honey? Eat only as much as you need, lest you be overfilled and vomit it'. Acher cut down the plantings. Rabbi Akiva entered in peace and left in peace.

Versions of the story also appear in the esoteric Hekhalot literature.

== Exposition ==
Rashi says that ben Azzai died from looking at the Divine Presence. Ben Zoma's harm was in losing his sanity. Acher's "cutting down the plantings" in the orchard refers to becoming a heretic from the experience. Acher means "the other one", and is the Talmudic term for the tanna Elisha ben Abuyah (Yerushalmi identifies him as EbA on the following line; MSS Munich 6 of the Bavli and Hekhalot Zutarti read "Elisha ben Abuyah" in place of "Acher"). Akiva, in contrast to the other three, became the leading Rabbinic figure of the era.

Rashi explains that the four rabbis ascended to Heaven by utilizing the Divine Name, which might be understood as achieving a spiritual elevation through Jewish meditation practices.

The Tosafot, medieval commentaries on the Talmud, say that the four sages "did not go up literally, but it appeared to them as if they went up." On the other hand, Rabbi Louis Ginzberg wrote that the journey to paradise "is to be taken literally and not allegorically".

According to another interpretation, PaRDeS is an acronym for the four traditional methods of exegesis in Judaism. In this sense, they were the four to understand the whole Torah.

=== Interpretation in Kabbalah ===
Another version of the legend is also found in the mystical literature (Zohar I, 26b and Tikunei haZohar 40), which adds to the story:

The ancient Saba (an old man) stood up and said (to Shimon bar Yochai), "Rabbi, Rabbi! What is the meaning of what Rabbi Akiva said to his students, "When you come to the place of pure marble stones, do not say 'Water! Water!' lest you place yourselves in danger, for it is said, 'He who speaks untruths shall not stand before My eyes.'" But it is written, 'There shall be a firmament between the waters and it shall separate between water (above the firmament) and water (below the firmament)' (Genesis 1:6). Since the Torah describes the division of the waters in to upper and lower, why should it be problematic to mention this division? Furthermore, since there are upper and lower waters why did Rabbi Akiva warn them, "do not say, 'Water! Water!'""

The Holy Lamp (a title for Shimon bar Yochai) replied, "Saba, it is proper that you reveal this secret that the chevraya (Rabbi Shimon's circle of disciples) have not grasped clearly."

The ancient Saba answered, "Rabbi, Rabbi, Holy Lamp. Surely the pure marble stones are the letter yud—one the upper yud of the letter aleph, and one the lower yud of the letter aleph. Here there is no spiritual impurity, only pure marble stones, so there is no separation between one water and the other; they form a single unity from the aspect of the Tree of Life, which is the vav in the midst of the letter aleph. In this regard it states, 'and if he take of the Tree of Life (and eat and live forever)' (Genesis 3:22) ..."

Moses ben Jacob Cordovero explains the Zoharic passage in his Pardes Rimonim ("Orchard of Pomegranates"), whose title itself refers to the Pardes mystical ascent (Pardes: Shaar Arachei HaKinuim, entry on Mayim-Water). The meaning of the ascent is understood through Rabbi Akiva's warning. The danger concerns misinterpreting anthropomorphism in Kabbalah, introducing corporeal notions in the Divine. Emanations in Kabbalah bridge between the Ein Sof Divine Unity and the plurality of Creation. The fundamental mystical error involves separating between divine transcendence and immanence, as if they were a duality. Rather, all Kabbalistic emanations have no being of their own, but are nullified and dependent on their source of vitality in the One God. Nonetheless, Kabbalah maintains that God is revealed through the life of His emanations, Man interacting with Divinity in a mutual Flow of "Direct Light" from Above to Below and "Returning Light" from Below to Above. The Sefirot, including Wisdom, Compassion and Kingship comprise the dynamic life in God's Persona. In the highest of the Four Worlds (Atziluth), the complete nullification and Unity of the sefirot and Creation is revealed within its Divine source. Apparent separation only pertains, in successive degrees, to the lower Three Worlds and our Physical Realm. Introducing false separation causes the exile of the Shekhinah within Creation from God. From Cordovero's explanation:

The meaning of Rabbi Akiva's warning is that the Sages should not declare that there are two types of water, since there are not, lest you endanger yourself because of the sin of separation. ... The marble stones represent the letter י yud ... a yud at the beginning, and a yud at the end. ... The first is Wisdom, the second Kingship, which is also Wisdom according to the light that returns from Below to Above. The upper is the yud of the Tetragrammaton (first letter), while the lower is the yud of Adonai (last letter). The latter is "female waters", and the former is "male waters" ... the inner and outer aspects ... signified by the top and the bottom yuds of the letter א aleph. ... Each is a stone because its shape is round. White "marble" indicates Compassion, similar to "waters of kindness". ... Wisdom is יש "Yesh" Being. Kinship is שי "Shay" (reversed). Combined they form שיש "Shayish" (marble). The letter ש Shin are the dividing emanations. When the two lights combine as "marble", the two yuds combine as one. ... These waters are completely pure. ... Through Compassion the daughter (Kingship) is able to ascend "to her father's house as in her youth". The firmament between them ו (letter Vav in the א aleph), which is Compassion, unites them. ... There is no separation other than in a place of spiritual impurity, but "Here there is no impurity ... the Tree of Life" in Atzilut.

== See also ==
- Pardes (exegesis)
- Elisha ben Abuyah
- Jewish eschatology#World to come
- Garden of Eden
- Maaseh Breishit and Maaseh Merkavah
- Merkabah mysticism
- Four Worlds
- Jewish eschatology
