= Elliot R. Wolfson =

Scholar of Jewish mysticism

- Title: Marsha and Jay Glazer Endowed Chair in Jewish Studies Distinguished Professor of Religion Emeritus

Academic background
- Education: Queens College (BA, MA) Brandeis University (MA, PhD)
- Thesis: "Sefer ha-Rimmon: Critical Edition and. Introductory Study" (1986)
- Doctoral advisor: Alexander Altmann

Academic work
- Discipline: Religious Studies
- Institutions: University of California, Santa Barbara • New York University

Elliot R. Wolfson (born November 23, 1956) is a scholar of Jewish mysticism, comparative religion, and philosophy. From 2014 to 2024 he was the Marsha and Jay Glazer Endowed Chair in Jewish Studies at the University of California, Santa Barbara, where he now serves as Distinguished Professor of Religion Emeritus. He was previously the Abraham Lieberman Professor of Hebrew and Judaic studies at New York University (1987–2014).

Wolfson earned B.A. and M.A. degrees in philosophy at Queens College of the City University of New York, and M.A. and Ph.D. degrees in Near Eastern and Judaic studies from Brandeis University, where he trained under the supervision of Alexander Altmann.

Described as "one of the most prominent living scholars in the field of religion," Wolfson is considered an authority on the history of Jewish mysticism known for his application of frameworks in philosophy, literary criticism, and feminist theory to the study of Kabbalistic texts. He is also considered to be "the leading scholarly interpreter" of Menachem Mendel Schneerson, seventh leader of the Chabad-Lubavitch Hasidic dynasty.

== Career ==
Wolfson was born in Newark, New Jersey, in 1956, and grew up in Brooklyn, New York, in a neighborhood inhabited largely by East European refugees, Syrian Jews, and Italian Catholics. The son of an Orthodox rabbi, Wolfson attended a traditional yeshiva and had early, formative experiences with Chabad-Lubavitch. He earned B.A. and M.A. degrees in philosophy at Queens College of the City University of New York (1979), where he studied under Edith Wyschogrod. He went on to pursue graduate study in Jewish mysticism at Brandeis University, receiving a second M.A. (1983) and Ph.D. (1986) under the supervision of Alexander Altmann, a seminal figure in the American study of Jewish mysticism. For his dissertation, Wolfson prepared a critical edition of Sefer ha-Rimmon (The Book of the Pomegranate) by Moses de León, which he revised and published in 1988.

After completing his dissertation, Wolfson taught for a year at Cornell University as an Andrew W. Mellon Teaching Fellow in the Humanities (1986-1987) before joining the faculty of the Skirball Department of Hebrew and Judaic Studies at New York University in 1987, where he was subsequently appointed as the Abraham Lieberman Professor. He served as director of Religious Studies at NYU from 1995 to 2002, and continued teaching at that institution until 2014. Throughout his tenure he also held various visiting and adjunct positions, including at Princeton University (1992), the University of Chicago (1992), the Russian State University for the Humanities (1995), and Columbia University (1989-2006). It was during this period that Wolfson produced some of his most acclaimed monographs, including Language, Eros, Being: Kabbalistic Hermeneutics and Poetic Imagination (Fordham University Press, 2005), which received that National Jewish Book Award for Excellence in Scholarship.

In 2014, Wolfson was appointed to the Marsha and Jay Glazer Chair in Jewish Studies in the Department of Religious Studies at the University of California, Santa Barbara. His tenure at UC Santa Barbara marked a shift in focus from classical Kabbalah to questions of philosophy and literary theory, exemplified by studies on Martin Heidegger and Susan Taubes. In 2025 Wolfson retired from teaching responsibilities and was titled Distinguished Professor of Religion Emeritus. A Festschrift was published in his honor in 2024.

Wolfson has been the editor of the Journal of Jewish Thought and Philosophy since its inception in 1992, and has likewise served on numerous editorial boards for book series and journals. While best known for his scholarship, Wolfson has also used poetry and painting as a means of communicating themes in the history of Kabbalah. A selection of his paintings were exhibited at the Station Museum of Contemporary Art in 2010.

Wolfson's son, Elijah Wolfson, was formerly a senior editor at Newsweek. and is now an editorial director at Time. His other son, Josiah Wolfson, is owner of Aeon Bookstore in Manhattan.

== Honors and awards ==
Wolfson's publications have won prestigious awards such as the American Academy of Religion's Award for Excellence in the Study of Religion in the Category of Historical Studies in 1995, the American Academy of Religion's Award for Excellence in Constructive and Reflective Studies in 2012.

Wolfson won two National Jewish Book Awards in the Scholarship category, in 1995 for Through a Speculum That Shines and in 2005 for Language, Eros, Being: Kabbalistic Hermeneutics and Poetic Imagination.

Additionally, Wolfson has been the recipient of several academic honors and awards:

- The Regenstein Visiting Professor in Jewish Studies in the Divinity School, University of Chicago (1992);
- Visiting Professor in the Russian State University in the Humanities (1995);
- Fellow at the Institute for Advanced Study, Princeton, New Jersey (1996);
- Shoshana Shier Distinguished Visiting Professor, University of Toronto (1998);
- Fellow at the Institute for Advanced Studies, Hebrew University (2000, 2008–2009);
- Crown-Minnow Visiting Professor of Theology and Jewish Studies, University of Notre Dame (2002);
- Brownstone Visiting Professor of Jewish Studies, Dartmouth College (2003);
- Visiting Professor in the Humanities Center, Johns Hopkins University (2005);
- Professor of Jewish Mysticism in Shandong University, Jinan, China (2005);
- Lynette S. Autrey Visiting Professor, Humanities Research Center, Rice University (2007);
- Fellow at the Katz Center for Advanced Judaic Studies at the University of Pennsylvania (2012);
- Weinstock Visiting Professor of Jewish Studies, Harvard University (2016).
- Fellow at the Center for the Study of World Religions, Harvard University (2024-2025).
- He has also taught at Cornell University, Queens College, Princeton University, Jewish Theological Seminary of America, Reconstructionist Rabbinical College, Hebrew Union College, Bard College, and Columbia University.

Wolfson is a fellow of the American Academy of Arts and Sciences, the American Academy of Jewish Research, and the American Society for the Study of Religion.

== Books ==
History

- The Book of the Pomegranate: Moses de Leon's Sefer ha-Rimmon (Scholars Press, 1988)
- Through a Speculum That Shines: Vision and Imagination in Medieval Jewish Mysticism (Princeton University Press, 1994)
- Along the Path: Studies in Kabbalistic Hermeneutics, Myth, and Symbolism (State University of New York Press, 1995)
- Circle in the Square: Studies in the Use of Gender in Kabbalistic Symbolism (State University of New York Press, 1995)
- Abraham Abulafia—Kabbalist and Prophet: Hermeneutics, Theosophy, and Theurgy (Cherub Press, 2000)
- Language, Eros, and Being: Kabbalistic Hermeneutics and the Poetic Imagination (Fordham University Press, 2005)
- Alef, Mem, Tau: Kabbalistic Musings on Time, Truth, and Death (University of California Press, 2006)
- Venturing Beyond: Law and Morality in Kabbalistic Mysticism (Oxford University Press, 2006)
- Luminal Darkness: Imaginal Gleanings From Zoharic Literature (Oneworld Publications, 2007)
- Open Secret: Postmessianic Messianism and the Mystical Revision of Menahem Mendel Schneerson (Columbia University Press, 2009)
- A Dream Interpreted Within a Dream: Oneiropoiesis and the Prism of Imagination (Zone Books, 2011)
- Giving Beyond the Gift: Apophasis and Overcoming Theomania (Fordham University Press, 2014)
- Elliot Wolfson: Poetic Thinking, edited by Hava Tirosh-Samuelson and Aaron W. Hughes (Brill, 2015)
- The Duplicity of Philosophy's Shadow: Heidegger, Nazism, and the Jewish Other (Columbia University Press, 2018)
- Heidegger and Kabbalah: Hidden Gnosis and the Path of Poiesis (Indiana University Press, 2019)
- Suffering Time: Philosophical, Kabbalistic, and Ḥasidic Reflections on Temporality (Brill, 2021)
- The Philosophical Pathos of Susan Taubes: Between Nihilism and Hope (Stanford University Press, 2023)
- New Paths in Jewish and Religious Studies: Essays in Honor of Professor Elliot R. Wolfson, edited by Glenn Dynner, Susannah Heschel, and Shaul Magid (Purdue University Press, 2024)
- Nocturnal Seeing: Hopelessness of Hope and Philosophical Gnosis in Susan Taubes, Gillian Rose, and Edith Wyschogrod (Stanford University Press, 2025)
- Apophasis and Envisioning the Invisible: Unveiling Veils of Infinity (Brill, 2026)

Edited books

- Perspectives on Jewish Thought and Mysticism, edited with Alfred Ivry and Alan Arkush (Harwood Academic Publishers, 1998)
- Rending the Veil: Concealment and Secrecy in the History of Religions (Seven Bridges Press, 1999)
- Suffering Religion, edited with Robert Gibbs (Routledge, 2002)
- New Directions in Jewish Philosophy, edited with Aaron Hughes (Indiana University Press, 2009)
- Studies in Medieval Jewish Intellectual and Social History: Festschrift in Honor of Robert Chazan, edited with David Engel and Lawrence H. Schiffman (Brill, 2012)
- D. G. Leahy and the Thinking Now Occurring, edited with Lissa McCullough (State University of New York Press, 2021)

Poetry

- Pathwings: Poetic-Philosophic Reflections on the Hermeneutics of Time and Language (Station Hill Press, 2004)
- Footdreams and Treetales: 92 Poems (Fordham University Press, 2007)
- Unveiling the Veil of Unveiling: Philosophical Aphorisms and Poems on Time, Language, Being, and Truth (Panui, 2021)
