= Simeon ben Azzai =

2nd century tanna

Simeon ben Azzai or simply Ben Azzai (Hebrew: שמעון בן עזאי) was a distinguished tanna of the first third of the 2nd century.

== Biography ==
Ben Azzai is sometimes called "Rabbi", but, in spite of his great learning, this title did not rightfully belong to him, for he remained all his life in the ranks of the "talmidim" or "talmidei hakhamim" (pupils or disciples of the wise). Ben Azzai and Ben Zoma were considered in the tannaitic school-tradition as the highest representatives of this degree in the hierarchy of learning.

Ben Azzai is especially named as an eminent example of a "pupil who is worthy of the hora'ah," of the right of independent judgment in questions of religious law. Ben Azzai was close to the leaders of the school of Jabneh. On the same day, he (1) handed down "from the mouth of 72 elders" present a halakhic decision (which was accepted in Jabneh on the day when Eleazar ben Azariah was elected president in the place of Gamaliel II) and also (2) resolved that the books Kohelet and Shir ha-Shirim were as sacred as the other Scriptures, thereby officially closing the collection of Biblical writings or canon.

Chief among Ben Azzai's teachers was Joshua ben Hananiah, whose opinions he expounded, proved to be correct, or defended against Akiva. Akiva himself was not really Ben Azzai's teacher, although the latter occasionally calls him so, and once even regrets that he did not stand in closer relation as pupil to Akiva; and he expressed the same regret in regard to Ishmael ben Elisha. In his halakhic opinions and Biblical exegesis, as well as in other sayings, Ben Azzai follows Akiva; and from the tone in which he speaks of Akiva in the discourses that have been handed down, the Amoraim concluded that his relations with Akiva were both those of pupil and of colleague.

=== Piety and devotion to study ===
Ben Azzai's most prominent characteristic was the extraordinary assiduity with which he pursued his studies. It was said of him afterward, "At the death of Ben Azzai the last industrious man died". A later tradition says of the zealous studies of Ben Azzai and Akiva (by way of reference to Psalms 114:8) that in their perceptive faculty both had been as hard as rock; but, because they exerted themselves so greatly in their studies, God opened for the man entrance into the Torah, so that Ben Azzai could explain even those things in the Halakah that the schools of Shammai and Hillel had not understood. His love of study induced Ben Azzai to remain unmarried, although he himself preached against celibacy, and even was betrothed to Rabbi Akiva's daughter, who waited for years for him to marry her, as her mother had waited for Akiva. When Eleazar ben Azariah reproved him for this contradiction between his life and his teachings, he replied: "What shall I do? My soul clings lovingly to the Torah; let others contribute to the preservation of the race".

Another characteristic of Ben Azzai was his great piety. It was said, "He who has seen Ben Azzai in his dreams is himself on the way to piety". Thanks to this piety he could, without injury to his soul, devote himself to theosophic speculations, when he, like Ben Zoma, Elisha ben Abuyah, and Akiva, entered, as tradition has it, into the garden ("pardes") of the esoteric doctrine. Tradition says of him: "He beheld the mysteries of the garden and died; of him Scripture says: Precious in the eyes of God is the death of his pious ones." With reference to this verse, Ben Azzai himself had taught that God shows to the pious, near the hour of their death, the rewards awaiting them. Other sayings of his concerning the hour of death have been handed down. According to a tradition not entirely trustworthy, Ben Azzai was among the first victims of the persecutions under Hadrian; his name, therefore, is found on a list of the ten martyrs.

=== Reputation ===
Ben Azzai's posthumous fame was extraordinary. The greatest amora of Israel (Rav Johanan) and the greatest amora of Babylonia (Rav) each said, in order to mark their authority as teachers of the Law: "Here I am a Ben Azzai". The name of Ben Azzai is applied in the same sense by the great Babylonian amora Abaye and Raba.

An aggadic legend from Israel relates of him the following:

Once, as Ben Azzai was expounding the Scriptures, flames blazed up around him, and being asked whether he was a student of the mysteries of the 'Chariot of God,' he replied: "I string together, like pearls, the words of the Torah with those of the Prophets, and those of the Prophets with those of the Hagiographers; and therefore the words of the Torah rejoice as on the day when they were revealed in the flames of Sinai."

== Teachings ==
Many teachings of Ben Azzai's, with and without Biblical foundation, have been preserved. Two of these were included in Pirkei Avot. After a saying of Ben Azzai, at the beginning of the third chapter of Derekh Eretz Rabbah, this little book (which began originally with that chapter) is called "Perek Ben Azzai".

In a teaching that recalls a fundamental thought of Akiva, Ben Azzai gives the characteristic features of a kind of deterministic view of the world: "By your name they shall call you, at the place where you belong they shall see you, what is yours they shall give to you; no man touches that which is destined for his neighbor; and no government infringes even by a hair's breadth upon the time marked for another government". Following Hillel, Akiva had declared the commandment "you shall love thy neighbor like yourself" to be the greatest fundamental commandment of the Jewish doctrine, but Ben Azzai, in reference to this, said that a still greater principle was found in the scriptural verse, "This is the book of the generations of man [Adam]. In the day that God created man, in the likeness of God He made him". Ben Azzai explained the commandment to love God with all the soul in the same manner as Akiva: "Love him even to the last breath of the soul!" Several of Ben Azzai's aggadic teachings, having been called forth by those of Akiva, are introduced by the words, "I do not wish to oppose the interpretation of my master, but will only add to his words".

Ben Azzai's observations on sacrifices are obviously directed against Gnosticism. In opposition to the Gnostic doctrine that the laws of sacrifice could have originated only with a secondary god (the demiurge, who is merely just, not beneficent), Ben Azzai notes that not any one of the various names of God in Judaism used in connection with the sacrificial laws, but precisely the distinctive name, the Tetragrammaton, in which especially the goodness of God is emphasized, in order that the "minim" (disbelievers) might not have an opportunity to prove their views by the Bible.

Ben Azzai's symbolic interpretation of the first word of Lamentations (איכה) is also polemical and probably directed against Pauline Christianity. He holds that the gematria of the letters of this word indicates that the Israelites were not exiled until they had denied the one God (א), the ten commandments (י), the law of circumcision, given to the twentieth generation after Adam (כ), and the five (ה) books of the Torah.

== Quotes ==
- A mitzvah draws in its wake another mitzvah, while a transgression draws in its wake another transgression.
- Despise no man, nor ignore any matter; for there is not a man that has not his hour, nor is there a thing that has not its place.

== In popular culture ==
In Jorge Luis Borges's story "Three Versions of Judas", the narrator mentions that Simeon ben Azzai saw the Garden of Eden and died.

In Milton Steinberg's novel As a Driven Leaf, Ben Azzai partakes in Elisha Ben Abuyah's research project to reconcile Jewish faith with other wisdom traditions. He dies in a state of rapture during the peak of his spiritual inquiries.

Ben Azzai (as Ben Azai) is mentioned in a quotation in Robert Silverberg's 1965 story "The Sixth Palace".
