= Maaseh Merkabah =

Hebrew-language Jewish mystical text dating from the Gaonic period

The Ma'aseh Merkabah (Hebrew: מעשה מרכבה, lit. 'Work of the Chariot') is a Hebrew-language Jewish mystical text dating from the Gaonic period that comprises a collection of hymns recited by the "descenders" and heard during their ascent. It is part of the tradition of Merkabah mysticism and the Hekhalot literature. The text was first edited by Gershom Scholem (1965). An English translation by Janowitz can be found in her Poetics of Ascent, pages 29–81. The critical edition and translation of the text was published by Michael D. Swartz.

== Contents ==
Like most other Hekhalot texts, the Ma'aseh Merkabah revolves around the knowledge of secret names of God used theurgically for mystical ascent. It begins with a conversation between Rabbi Ishmael and Rabbi Akiva, where the latter expounds on the mysteries of the spiritual world, as well as describing the appearance of the heavenly planes. Hymns with long lists of secret names of God are present throughout the text, as well as many angel names including a section listing the various angelic rules of the 7 palaces. Specific ritual instructions are also given at various points in the text, including a technique to invoke the angel of the Presence:

The name of the prince of the Torah is Yofiel, and everyone who seeks him must sit for 40 days in fast, eat his bread with salt, and must not eat unclean food; he must perform 24 immersions, and not look at any kind of coloured garments; his eyes must be cast to the ground. And he must pray with all his strength, direct his heart to his prayer, and seal himself with his own seal, and pronounce 12 utterances: 'You are living God in heaven, engraved as a SPYSṬWS NWMSṬWS 'QNYPWS 'NBY...'

After more formulas, another prayer and ritual is given to protect the practitioner when the angel of the presence (named as PDQRM or PNQRS in the text) descends. This involves the recitation of various divine names over one's body, referred to as "seals", designed to ensure that the mystic does not perish due to the fearsome power of the angel:

Blessed are you YY who created heaven and earth with your wisdom. Your name is forever. ḤY 'WP SYSY PYY'W LW SM BY KYH TNYY the name of Your servant. By the Seven Seals that Rabbi Ishmael sealed on his heart. 'WRYS SSTYY on my feet, 'BG BGG on my heart, 'RYS TYP' on my right arm, 'WRYS TSY Y'H on my left arm...(etc.)

The text ends with a series of hymns for further ascent.
