= Hagigah =

Tractate of the Talmud

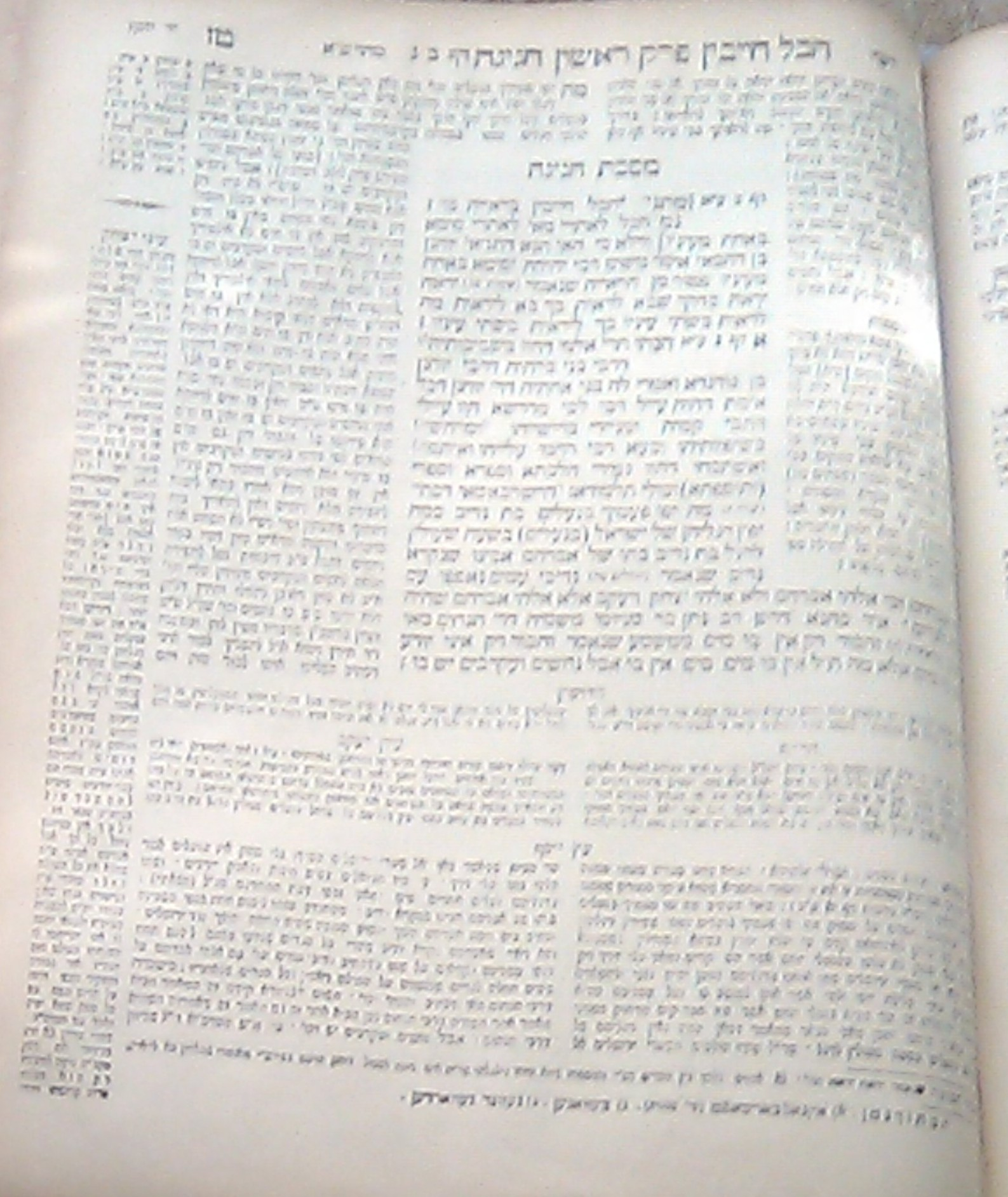
- A copy of the Hagigah printed in Vilnius before WWII

Tractate of the Talmud
- Seder: Moed
- Number of mishnahs: 23
- Chapters: 3
- Babylonian Talmud pages: 27
- Jerusalem Talmud pages: 22
- Tosefta chapters: 3

Hagigah or Chagigah (Hebrew: חֲגִיגָה, romanized: Ḥəḡiḡā, lit. 'Celebration, Festival') is one of the tractates comprising Moed, one of the six orders of the Mishnah, a collection of Jewish traditions included in the Talmud. It deals with the Three Pilgrimage Festivals of Passover, Shavuot, and Sukkot and the pilgrimage offering that men were supposed to bring to the Temple in Jerusalem. In the middle of the second chapter, the text discusses topics of ritual purity.

The tractate contains three chapters, spanning 27 pages in the Vilna Edition Shas of the Babylonian Talmud, making it relatively short. The second chapter contains much early aggadah, discussing the Genesis creation narrative and early merkabah mysticism. Its content is relatively light and uncomplicated except for the third chapter.
