= Tzav =

25th weekly parashah in the annual Jewish cycle of Torah reading

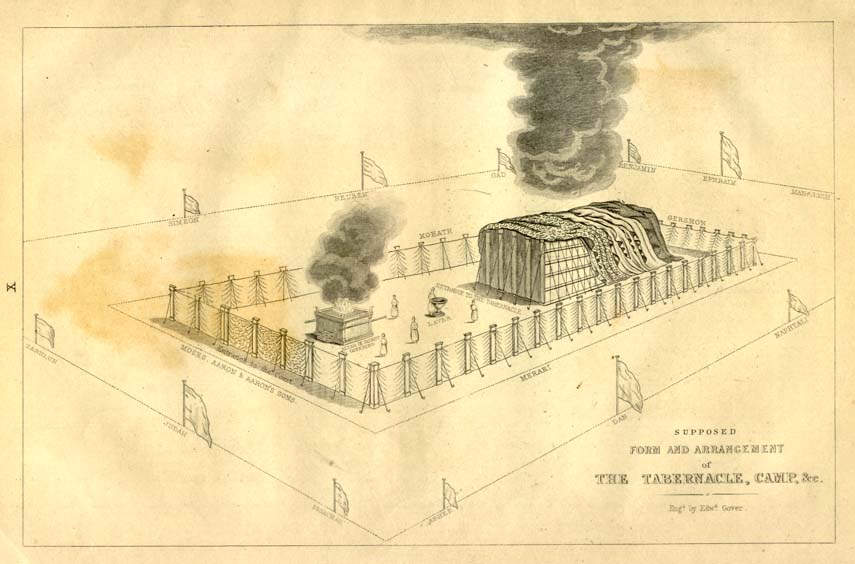
The Tabernacle and the Camp (19th Century drawing)

Tzav, Tsav, Zav, Sav, or Ṣaw (צַו—Hebrew for "command," the sixth word, and the first distinctive word, in the parashah) is the 25th weekly Torah portion (פָּרָשָׁה, parashah) in the annual Jewish cycle of Torah reading and the second in the Book of Leviticus. The parashah teaches how the priests performed the sacrifices and describes the ordination of Aaron and his sons. The parashah constitutes Leviticus 6:1–8:36. The parashah is made up of 5,096 Hebrew letters, 1,353 Hebrew words, 97 verses, and 170 lines in a Torah scroll (סֵפֶר תּוֹרָה, Sefer Torah). Jews read it the 24th or 25th Sabbath after Simchat Torah, generally in the second half of March or the first half of April.

== Readings ==
In traditional Shabbat Torah reading, the parashah is divided into seven readings called aliyot (עליות).

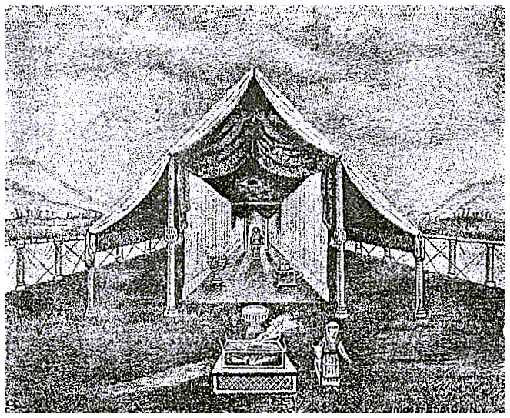
The Tabernacle (illustration from the 1901 Standard Eclectic Commentary)

=== First reading—Leviticus 6:1–11 ===
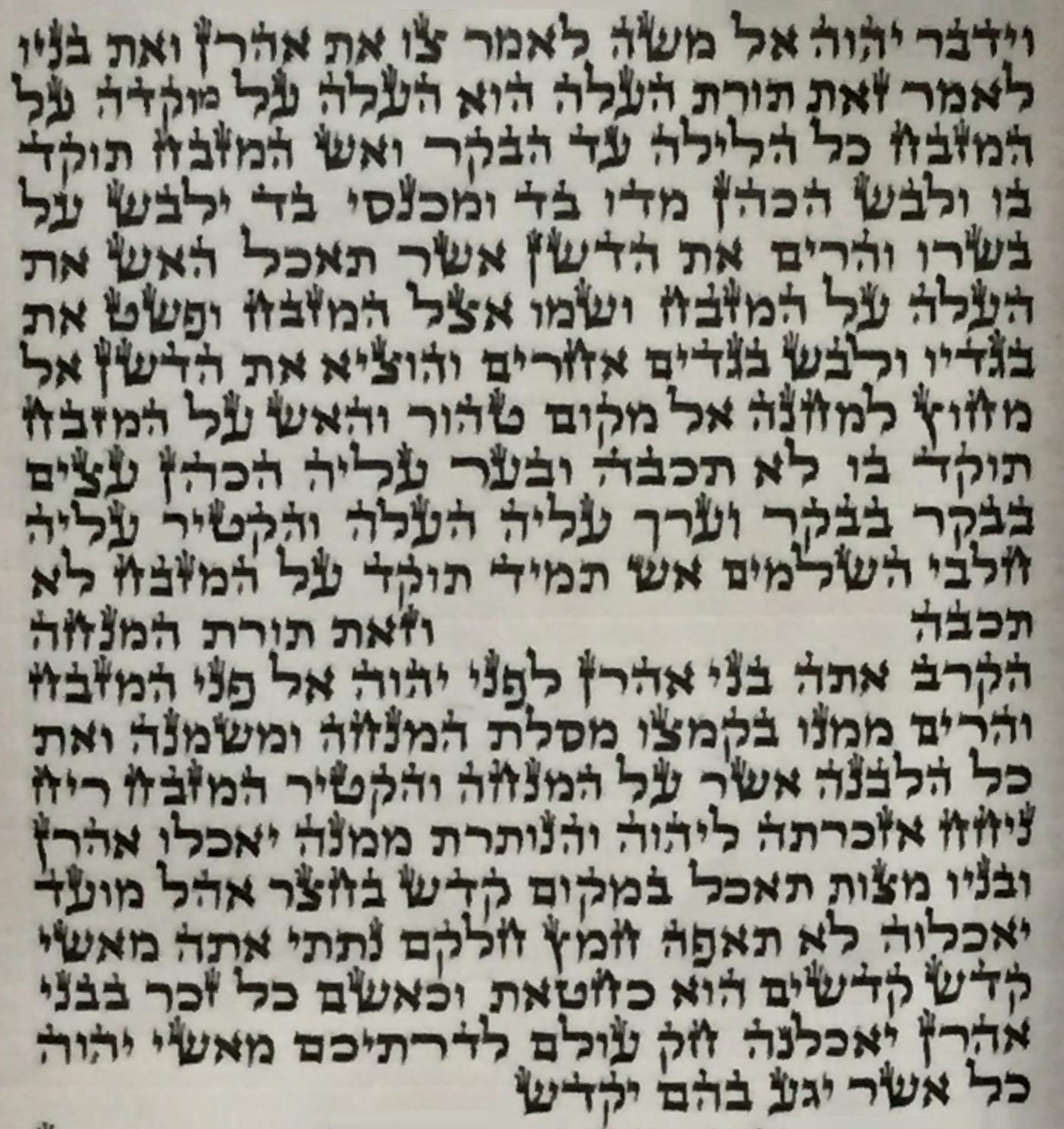
The first Aliyah of Parasha Tzav. The מ in the word מוֹקְדָה is small.

In the first reading, God told Moses to command Aaron and the priests about the rituals of the sacrifices (קָרְבָּנוֹת, qārbānoṯ).

The burnt offering (עֹלָה, ʿolā) was to burn on the altar until morning, when the priest was to clear the ashes to a place outside the camp. The priests were to keep the fire burning, every morning feeding it wood.

The gift offering (מִנְחָה, minḥā) was to be presented before the altar, a handful of it burned on the altar, and the balance eaten by the priests as unleavened cakes in the Tent of Meeting.

=== Second reading—Leviticus 6:12–7:10 ===
In the second reading, on the occasion of the High Priest's anointment, the meal offering was to be prepared with oil on a griddle and then entirely burned on the altar.

The sin offering (חַטָּאת, ḥaṭoṯ) was to be slaughtered at the same place as the burnt offering, and the priest who offered it was to eat it in the Tent of Meeting. If the sin offering was cooked in an earthen vessel, that vessel was to be broken afterward. A copper vessel could be rinsed with water and reused. If blood of the sin offering was brought into the Tabernacle for expiation, the entire offering was to be burned on the altar.

The guilt offering (אָשָׁם, āšām) was to be slaughtered at the same place as the burnt offering, the priest was to dash its blood on the altar, burn its fat, broad tail, kidneys, and protuberance on the liver on the altar, and the priest who offered it was to eat the balance of its meat in the Tent of Meeting.

The priest who offered a burnt offering kept the skin. The priest who offered it was to eat any baked or grilled meal offering, but every other meal offering was to be shared among all the priests.

=== Third reading—Leviticus 7:11–38 ===
In the third reading, the peace offering (שְׁלָמִים, šəlāmim), if offered for thanksgiving, was to be offered with unleavened cakes or wafers with oil, which would go to the priest, who would dash the blood of the peace offering upon the altar. All the meat of the peace offering had to be eaten on the day it was offered. If offered as a votive or a freewill offering, it could be eaten for two days, and what was then left on the third day was to be burned.

Meat that touched anything unclean could not be eaten; it had to be burned. Only an unclean person could not eat meat from peace offerings, with punishment for transgression being banishment from the community. One could eat no fat or blood, with transgression also leading to exile.

The person offering the peace offering had to present the offering and its fat himself; the priest would burn the fat on the altar, the breast would go to the priests, and the right thigh would go to the priest who offered the sacrifice.

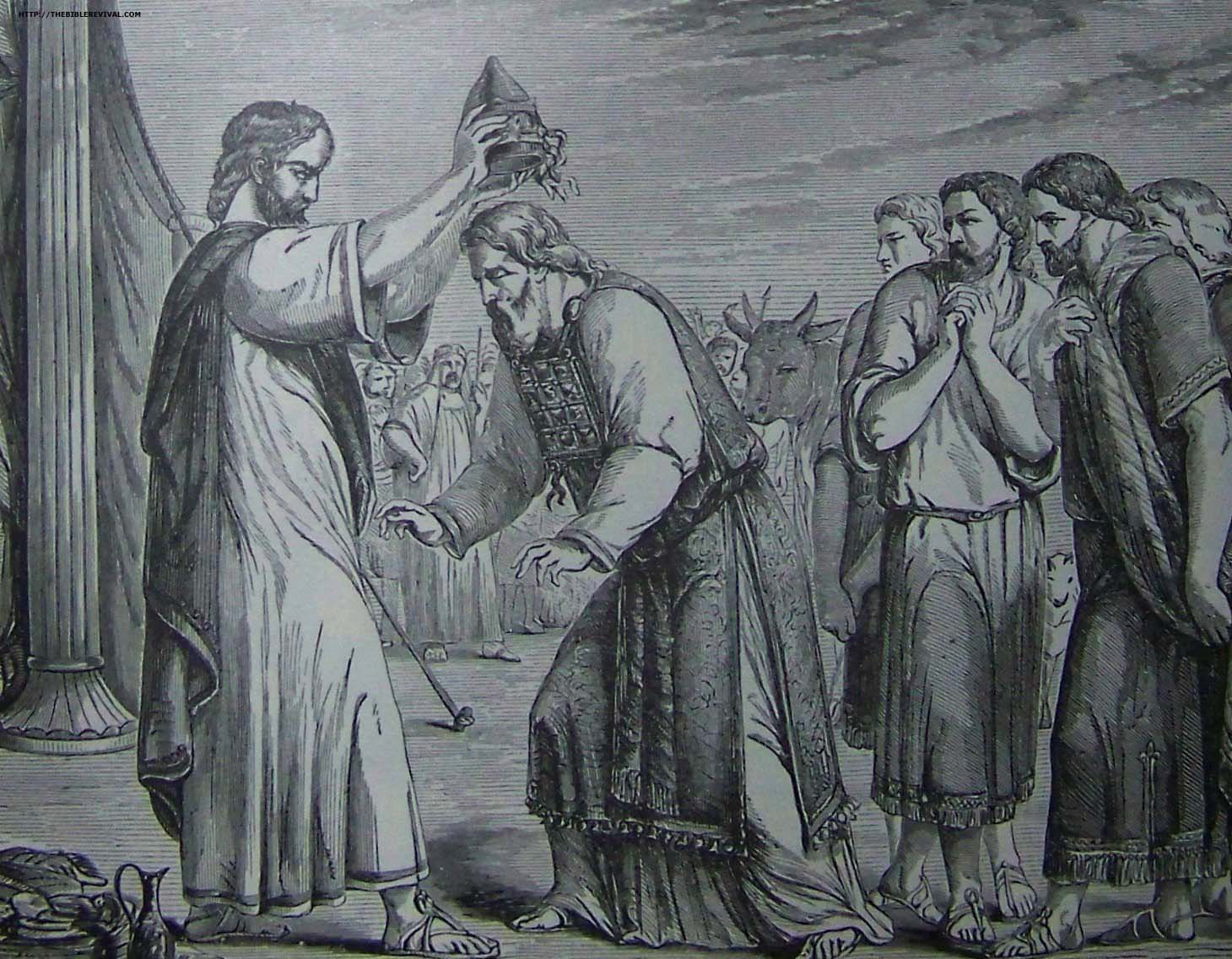
Consecration of Aaron and His Sons (illustration from the 1890 Holman Bible)

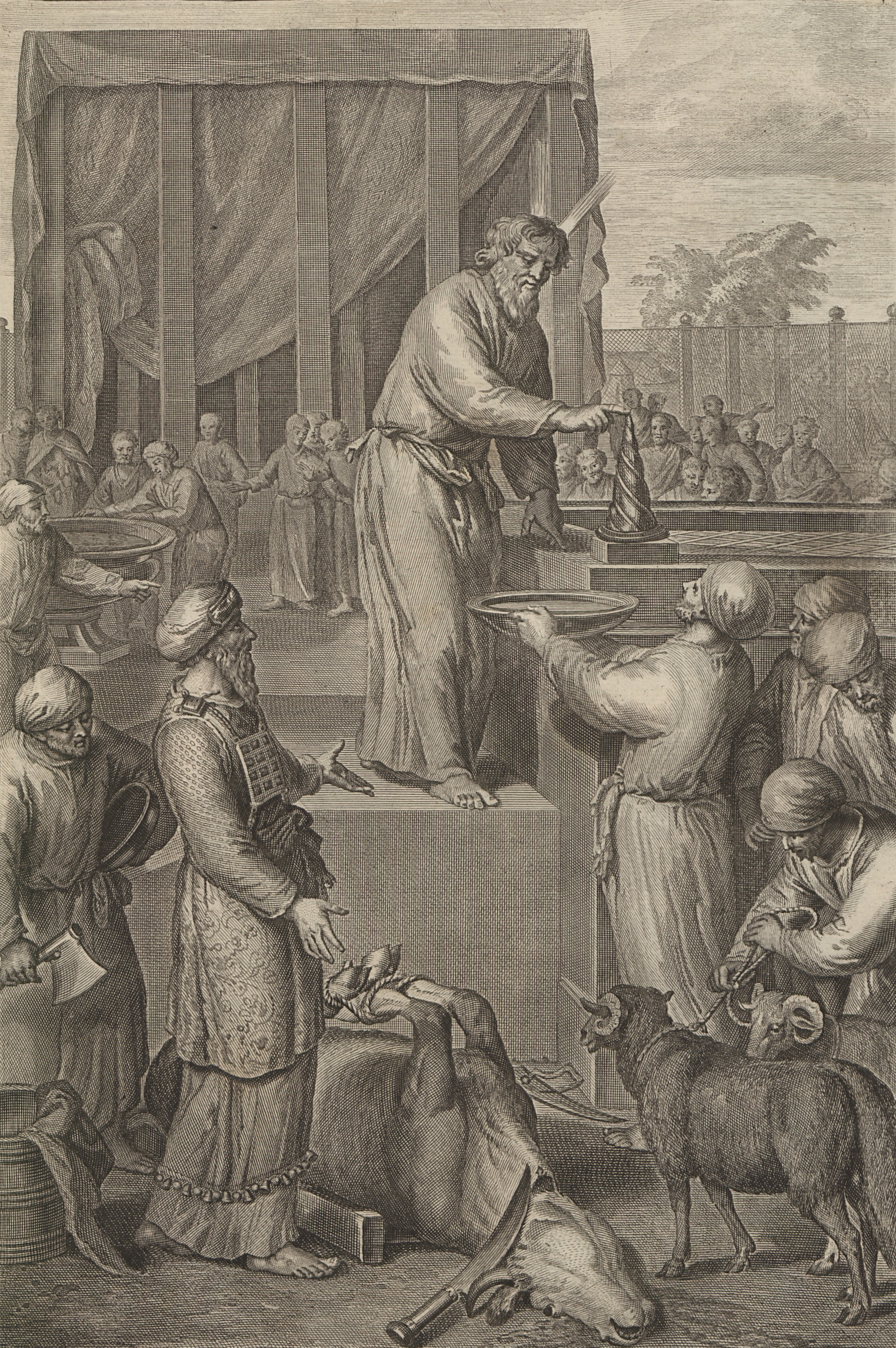
Moses Consecrates Aaron and His Sons and Offers Their Sin Offering (illustration from the 1728 Figures de la Bible)

=== Fourth reading—Leviticus 8:1–13 ===
In the fourth reading, God instructed Moses to assemble the whole community at the entrance of the Tent of Meeting for the priests' ordination. Moses brought Aaron and his sons forward, washed them, and dressed Aaron in his vestments. Moses anointed and consecrated the Tabernacle and all that was in it, and then anointed and consecrated Aaron and his sons.

=== Fifth reading—Leviticus 8:14–21 ===
In the fifth reading, Moses led forward a bull for a sin offering, Aaron and his sons laid their hands on the bull's head, and it was slaughtered. Moses put the bull's blood on the horns and the base of the altar, burned the fat, the protuberance of the liver, and the kidneys on the altar, and burned the rest of the bull outside the camp. Moses then brought forward a ram for a burnt offering, Aaron and his sons laid their hands on the ram's head, and it was slaughtered. Moses dashed the blood against the altar and burned all of the rams on the altar.

=== Sixth reading—Leviticus 8:22–29 ===
In the sixth reading, Moses then brought forward a second ram for ordination; Aaron and his sons laid their hands on the ram's head, and it was slaughtered. Moses put some of its blood on Aaron and his sons, on the ridges of their right ears, on the thumbs of their right hands, and on the big toes of their right feet. Moses then burned the animal's fat, broad tail, protuberance of the liver, kidneys, and right thigh on the altar with a cake of unleavened bread, a cake of oil bread, and a wafer as an ordination offering. Moses raised the breast before God and then took it as his portion.

=== Seventh reading—Leviticus 8:30–36 ===
In the seventh reading, Moses sprinkled oil and blood on Aaron and his sons and their vestments. And Moses told Aaron and his sons to boil the meat at the entrance of the Tent of Meeting and eat it there, and remain at the Tent of Meeting for seven days to complete their ordination, and they did all the things that God had commanded through Moses.

=== Readings according to the triennial cycle ===
Jews who read the Torah according to the triennial cycle of Torah reading read the parashah according to the following schedule:

	Year 1	Year 2	Year 3
	2023, 2026, 2029 . . .	2024, 2027, 2030 . . .	2025, 2028, 2031 . . .
Reading	6:1–7:10	7:11–38	8:1–36
1	6:1–3	7:11–15	8:1–5
2	6:4–6	7:16–18	8:6–9
3	6:7–11	7:19–21	8:10–13
4	6:12–16	7:22–27	8:14–17
5	6:17–23	7:28–31	8:18–21
6	7:1–6	7:32–34	8:22–29
7	7:7–10	7:35–38	8:30–36
Maftir	7:7–10	7:35–38	8:33–36

== In inner-Biblical interpretation ==
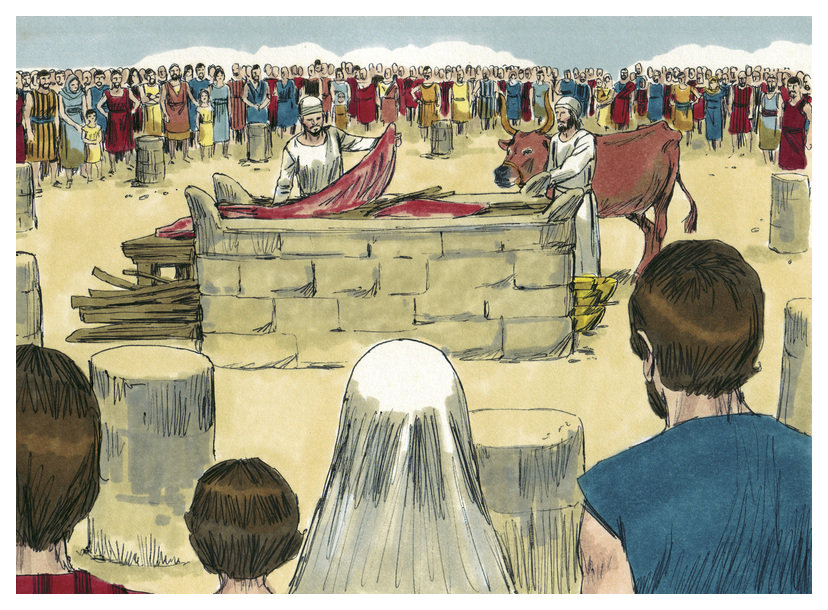
Priests Offering a Sacrifice (1984 illustration by Jim Padgett, courtesy of Distant Shores Media/Sweet Publishing)

This parashah and the preceding one (Vayikra) have parallels or are discussed in these Biblical sources:

=== Leviticus chapters 1–7 ===
In Psalm 50, God clarifies the purpose of sacrifices. God states that correct sacrifice was not the taking of a bull out of the sacrificer's house, nor the taking of a goat out of the sacrificer's fold, to convey to God, for every animal was already God's possession. The sacrificer was not to think of the sacrifice as food for God, for God neither feels hunger nor eats. Rather, the worshiper was to offer God the sacrifice of thanksgiving and call upon God in times of trouble, and thus God would deliver the worshiper, and the worshiper would honor God.

And Psalm 107 enumerates four occasions on which a thank-offering (זִבְחֵי תוֹדָה, zivchei todah), as described in Leviticus 7:12–15 (referring to a זֶבַח תּוֹדַת, zevach todah) would be appropriate: (1) passage through the desert, (2) release from prison, (3) recovery from serious disease, and (4) surviving a storm at sea.

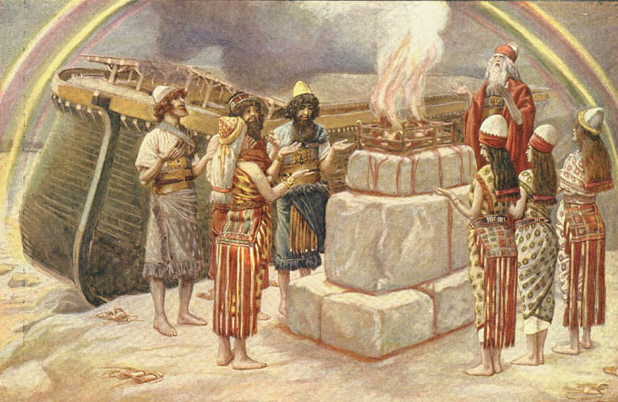
Noah's Sacrifice (watercolor circa 1896–1902 by James Tissot)

The Hebrew Bible reports several instances of sacrifices before God explicitly called for them in Leviticus 1–7. While Leviticus 1:3–17 and Leviticus 6:1–6 set out the procedure for the burnt offering (עֹלָה, olah), before then, Genesis 8:20 reports that Noah offered burnt-offerings (עֹלֹת, olot) of every clean beast and bird on an altar after the waters of the Flood subsided. The story of the Binding of Isaac includes three references to the burnt offering (עֹלָה, olah). In Genesis 22:2, God told Abraham to take Isaac and offer him as a burnt-offering (עֹלָה, olah). Genesis 22:3 then reports that Abraham rose early in the morning and split the wood for the burnt offering (עֹלָה, olah). And after the angel of the Lord averted Isaac's sacrifice, Genesis 22:13 reports that Abraham lifted his eyes and saw a ram caught in a thicket, and Abraham then offered the ram as a burnt offering (עֹלָה, olah) instead of his son. Exodus 10:25 reports that Moses pressed Pharaoh for Pharaoh to give the Israelites "sacrifices and burnt offerings" (זְבָחִים וְעֹלֹת, zevachim v'olot) to offer to God. And Exodus 18:12 reports that after Jethro heard all that God did to Pharaoh and the Egyptians, Jethro offered a burnt offering and sacrifices (עֹלָה וּזְבָחִים, olah uzevachim) to God.

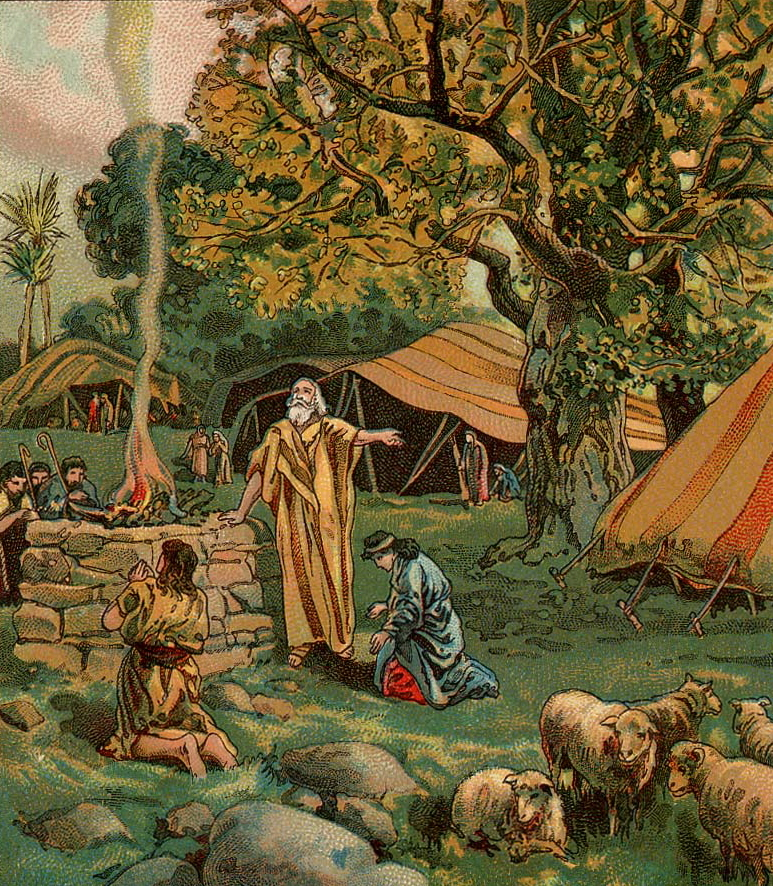
Abram Called To Be a Blessing (illustration from a Bible card published 1906 by the Providence Lithograph Company)

While Leviticus 2 and Leviticus 6:7–16 set out the procedure for the meal offering (מִנְחָה, minchah), before then, in Genesis 4:3, Cain brought an offering (מִנְחָה, minchah) of the fruit of the ground. And then Genesis 4:4–5 reports that God had respect for Abel and his offering (מִנְחָתוֹ, minchato), but for Cain and his offering (מִנְחָתוֹ, minchato), God had no respect.

And while Numbers 15:4–9 indicates that one bringing an animal sacrifice needed also to bring a drink offering (נֶּסֶךְ, nesech), before then, in Genesis 35:14, Jacob poured out a drink offering (נֶּסֶךְ, nesech) at Bethel.

More generally, the Hebrew Bible addressed "sacrifices" (זְבָחִים, zevachim) generically in connection with Jacob and Moses. After Jacob and Laban reconciled, Genesis 31:54 reports that Jacob offered a sacrifice (זֶבַח, zevach) on the mountain and shared a meal with his relatives. And after Jacob learned that Joseph was still alive in Egypt, Genesis 46:1 reports that Jacob journeyed to Beersheba and offered sacrifices (זְבָחִים, zevachim) to the God of his father, Isaac. And Moses and Aaron argued repeatedly with Pharaoh over their request to go three days' journey into the wilderness and sacrifice (וְנִזְבְּחָה, venizbechah) to God.

The Hebrew Bible also includes several ambiguous reports in which Abraham or Isaac built or returned to an altar and "called upon the name of the Lord." In these cases, the text implies but does not explicitly state that the Patriarch offered a sacrifice. And at God's request, Abraham conducted an unusual sacrifice at the Covenant between the Pieces (ברית בין הבתרים) in Genesis 15:9–21.

=== Leviticus chapter 8 ===
This is the pattern of instruction and construction of the Tabernacle and its furnishings:

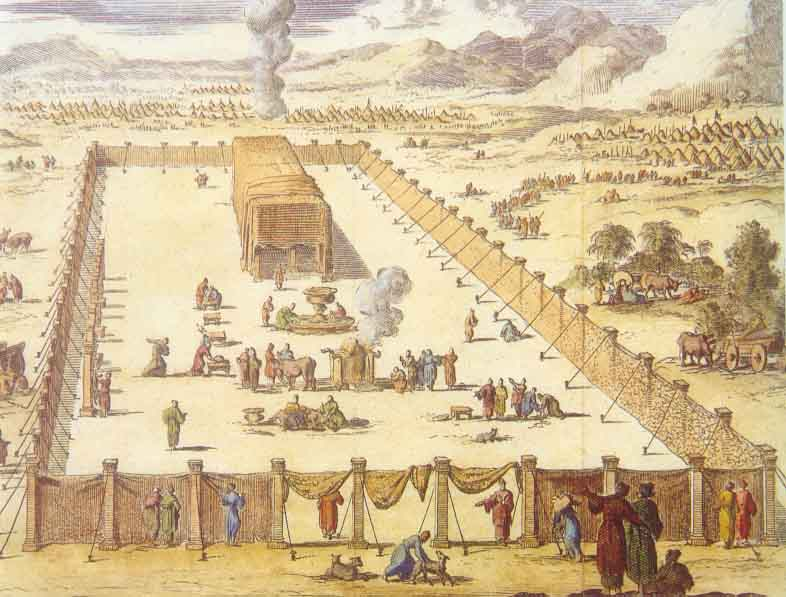
The Tabernacle

Item	Instruction		Construction	
Item	Order	Verses	Order	Verses
The Sabbath	16	Exodus 31:12–17	1	Exodus 35:1–3
Contributions	1	Exodus 25:1–9	2	Exodus 35:4–29
Craftspeople	15	Exodus 31:1–11	3	Exodus 35:30–36:7
Tabernacle	5	Exodus 26:1–37	4	Exodus 36:8–38
Ark	2	Exodus 25:10–22	5	Exodus 37:1–9
Table	3	Exodus 25:23–30	6	Exodus 37:10–16
Menorah	4	Exodus 25:31–40	7	Exodus 37:17–24
Altar of Incense	11	Exodus 30:1–10	8	Exodus 37:25–28
Anointing Oil	13	Exodus 30:22–33	9	Exodus 37:29
Incense	14	Exodus 30:34–38	10	Exodus 37:29
Altar of Sacrifice	6	Exodus 27:1–8	11	Exodus 38:1–7
Laver	12	Exodus 30:17–21	12	Exodus 38:8
Tabernacle Court	7	Exodus 27:9–19	13	Exodus 38:9–20
Priestly Garments	9	Exodus 28:1–43	14	Exodus 39:1–31
Ordination Ritual	10	Exodus 29:1–46	15	Leviticus 8:1–9:24
Lamp	8	Exodus 27:20–21	16	Numbers 8:1–4

Gordon Wenham noted that the phrase "as the Lord commanded Moses" or a similar phrase "recurs with remarkable frequency" in Leviticus 8–10, appearing in Leviticus 8:4, 5, 9, 13, 17, 21, 29, 34, 36; 9:6, 7, 10, 21; 10:7, 13, and 15.

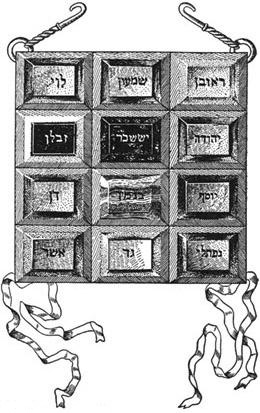
The Breastplate of the High Priest (illustration from the 1905–1906 Jewish Encyclopedia)

The Hebrew Bible refers to the Urim and Thummim in Exodus 28:30; Leviticus 8:8; Numbers 27:21; Deuteronomy 33:8; 1 Samuel 14:41 ("Thammim") and 28:6; Ezra 2:63; and Nehemiah 7:65; and may refer to them in references to "sacred utensils" in Numbers 31:6 and the Ephod in 1 Samuel 14:3 and 19; 23:6 and 9; and 30:7–8; and Hosea 3:4.

The Torah mentions the combination of ear, thumb, and toe in three places. In Exodus 29:20, God instructed Moses how to initiate the priests, telling him to kill a ram, take some of its blood, and put it on the tip of the right ear of Aaron and his sons, on the thumb of their right hand, and the great toe of their right foot, and dash the remaining blood against the altar round about. And then Leviticus 8:23–24 reports that Moses followed God's instructions to initiate Aaron and his sons. Then, Leviticus 14:14, 17, 25, and 28 set forth a similar procedure for the cleansing of a person with skin disease (צָּרַעַת, tzara'at). In Leviticus 14:14, God instructed the priest on the day of the person's cleansing to take some of the blood of a guilt-offering and put it upon the tip of the right ear, the thumb of the right hand, and the great toe of the right foot of the one to be cleansed. And then in Leviticus 14:17, God instructed the priest to put oil on the tip of the right ear, the thumb of the right hand, and the great toe of the right foot of the one to be cleansed, on top of the blood of the guilt-offering. Finally, in Leviticus 14:25 and 28, God instructed the priest to repeat the procedure on the eighth day to complete the person's cleansing.

== In early non-Rabbinic interpretation ==
The parashah has parallels or is discussed in these early non-Rabbinic sources:

=== Leviticus chapter 8 ===
Reading Leviticus 8:23–24, Philo noted that Moses took some blood from the sacrificed ram, holding a vial under it to catch it, and with it, he anointed three parts of the body of the initiated priests—the tip of the ear, the extremity of the hand, and the extremity of the foot, all on the right side. Philo taught that this signified that the perfect person must be pure in every word, action, and all of one's life. For it is hearing that judges a person's words, the hand is the symbol of action and the foot of the way in which a person walks in life. Philo taught that since each of these parts is an extremity of the body, and on the right side, this indicates that improvement in everything is to be arrived at by dexterity, being a portion of felicity, and being the true aim in life, which a person must necessarily labor to attain, and to which a person ought to refer all actions, aiming at them in life as an archer aims at a target.

== In classical rabbinic interpretation ==
The parashah is discussed in the Rabbinic literature from the era of the Mishnah and the Talmud:

=== Leviticus chapter 6 ===
Tractate Zevachim in the Mishnah, Tosefta, and Babylonian Talmud interpreted the law of animal sacrifices in Leviticus 1–5. The Mishnah taught that a sacrifice was slaughtered for the sake of six things: (1) for the sake of the sacrifice for which it was consecrated, (2) for the sake of the offerer, (3) for the sake of the Divine Name, (4) for the sake of the altar fires, (5) for the sake of an aroma, and (6) for the sake of pleasing God, and a sin-offering and a guilt-offering for the sake of sin. Rabbi Jose taught that even if the offerer did not have any of these purposes at heart, the offering was valid because it was a court regulation since the intention was determined only by the priest who performed the service. The Mishnah taught that the intention of the priest conducting the sacrifice determined whether the offering would prove valid.

Rabbi Simeon taught that the Torah generally required a burnt offering only as expiation for sinful meditation of the heart.

A Midrash taught that if people repent, it is accounted as if they had gone up to Jerusalem, built the Temple and the altars, and offered all the sacrifices ordained in the Torah. Rabbi Aha said in the name of Rabbi Hanina ben Pappa that God accounts studying the sacrifices as equivalent to offering them. Rav Huna taught that God said that engaging in studying Mishnah is as if one were offering up sacrifices. Samuel taught that God said that engaging in the study of the law is like building the Temple. And the Avot of Rabbi Natan taught that God loves Torah study more than sacrifice.

Rabbi Ammi taught that Abraham asked God if Israel would come to sin, would God punish them as God punished the generation of the Flood and the generation of the Tower of Babel. God answered that God would not. Abraham then asked God in Genesis 15:8: "How shall I know?" God replied in Genesis 15:9: "Take Me a heifer of three years old . . ." (indicating that Israel would obtain forgiveness through sacrifices). Abraham then asked God what Israel would do when the Temple no longer existed. God replied that whenever Jews read the Biblical text dealing with sacrifices, God would reckon it as if they were bringing an offering and exonerate all their iniquities.

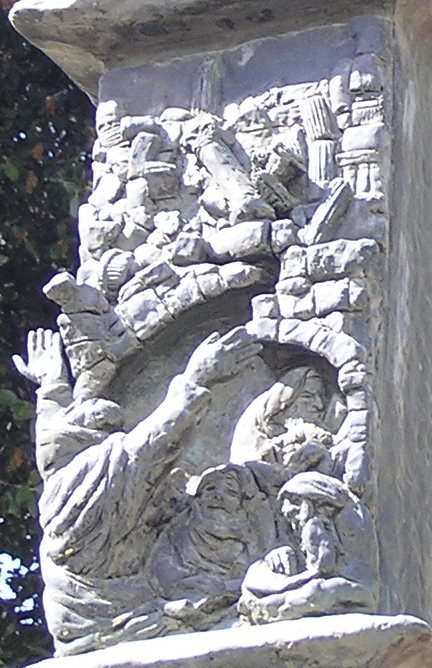
Joḥanan ben Zakai (detail from The Knesset Menorah in Jerusalem)

The Gemara taught that when Rav Sheshet fasted, on concluding his prayer, he added a prayer that God knew that when the Temple still stood, if people sinned, they used to bring sacrifices (pursuant to Leviticus 4:27–35 and 7:2–5), and though they offered only the animal's fat and blood, atonement was granted. Rav Sheshet continued that he had fasted and his fat and blood had diminished, so he asked that it be God's will to account for Rav Sheshet's fat and blood that had been diminished as if he had offered them on the Altar.

Rabbi Isaac declared that prayer is greater than sacrifice.

The Avot of Rabbi Natan taught that as Rabban Joḥanan ben Zakai and Rabbi Joshua were leaving Jerusalem, Rabbi Joshua expressed sorrow that the place where the Israelites had atoned for their iniquities had been destroyed. But Rabban Joḥanan ben Zakai told him not to grieve, for we have in acts of loving-kindness another atonement as effective as a sacrifice at the Temple, as Hosea 6:6 says, "For I desire mercy and not sacrifice."

Rabbi Mani of Sheab and Rabbi Joshua of Siknin, in the name of Rabbi Levi, explained the origin of Leviticus 6:1. Moses prayed on Aaron's behalf, noting that the beginning of Leviticus repeatedly referred to Aaron's sons, barely mentioning Aaron himself. Moses asked whether God could love well water but hate the well. Moses noted that God honored the olive tree and the vine for the sake of their offspring, teaching that the priests could use all trees' wood for the altar fire except that of the olive and vine. Moses thus asked God whether God might honor Aaron for the sake of his sons, and God replied that God would reinstate Aaron and honor him above his sons. And thus, God said to Moses the words of Leviticus 6:1, "Command Aaron and his sons."

Rabbi Abin deduced from Leviticus 6:1 that burnt offerings were wholly given to the flames.

The School of Rabbi Ishmael taught that whenever Scripture uses the word "command" (צַו, tzav) (as Leviticus 6:2 does), it denotes exhortation to obedience immediately and for all time. A Baraita deduced exhortation to immediate obedience from the use of the word "command" in Deuteronomy 3:28, which says, "charge Joshua, and encourage him, and strengthen him." The Baraita deduced exhortation to obedience for all time from the use of the word "command" in Numbers 15:23, which says, "Even all that the Lord has commanded you by the hand of Moses, from the day that the Lord gave the commandment, and onward throughout your generations."

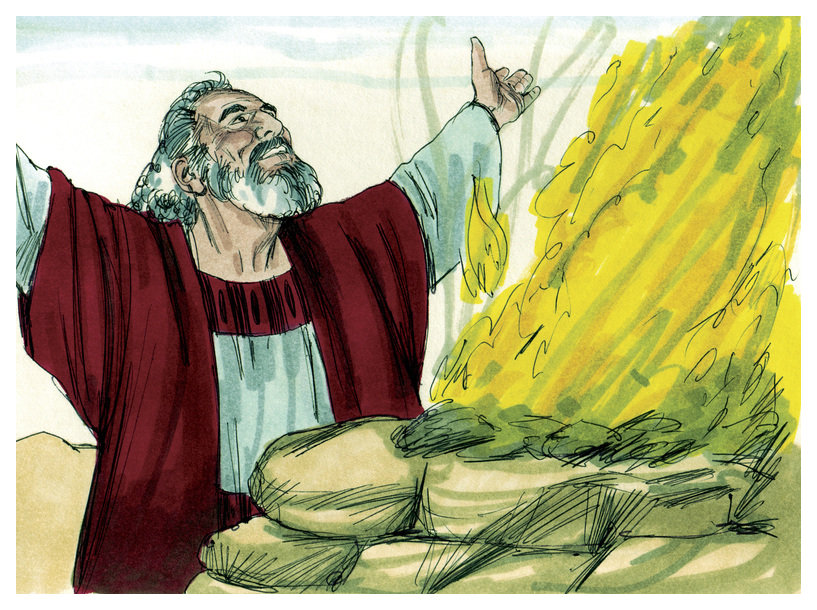
Noah's Sacrifice (1984 illustration by Jim Padgett, courtesy of Distant Shores Media/Sweet Publishing)

Rabbi Joshua of Siknin said in Rabbi Levi's name that the wording of Leviticus 6:2 supports the argument of Rabbi Jose bar Hanina (on which he differed with Rabbi Eleazar) that the descendants of Noah offered only burnt offerings (and not peace-offerings, as before the Revelation at Mount Sinai, people were unworthy to consume any part of an animal consecrated to God). Rabbi Joshua of Siknin noted that Leviticus 6:2 says, "This is the law of the burnt-offering: that is the burnt-offering," which Rabbi Joshua of Siknin read to mean "that is the burnt-offering" that the Noahides used to offer. But when Leviticus 7:11 addresses peace-offerings, it says, "And this is the law of the sacrifice of peace-offerings," and does not say, "that they offered" (which would indicate that they offered it in the past, before Revelation). Rabbi Joshua of Siknin thus read Leviticus 7:11 to teach that they would offer the peace offering only after the events of Leviticus 7:11.

Reading the words of Leviticus 6:2, "This is the law of the burnt-offering: it is that which goes up on its firewood upon the altar all night to the morning," the Mishnah concluded that the altar sanctified whatever was eligible for it. Rabbi Joshua taught that whatever was eligible for the altar fire did not descend once it had ascended. Thus, just as the burnt offering, which was eligible for the altar fire, did not descend once it had ascended, whatever was eligible for the altar fire did not descend.

The Gemara interpreted the words in Leviticus 6:2, "This is the law of the burnt-offering: It is that which goes up on its firewood upon the altar all night into the morning." From the passage, "which goes up on its firewood upon the altar all night," the Rabbis deduced that once a thing had been placed upon the altar, it could not be taken down all night. Rabbi Judah taught that the words "This . . . goes up on . . . the altar all night" exclude three things. According to Rabbi Judah, they exclude (1) an animal slaughtered at night, (2) an animal whose blood was spilled, and (3) an animal whose blood was carried out beyond the curtains. Rabbi Judah taught that if any of these things had been placed on the altar, it was brought down. Rabbi Simeon noted that Leviticus 6:2 says "burnt-offering." From this, Rabbi Simeon taught that one can only know that a fit burnt offering remained on the altar. But Rabbi Simeon taught that the phrase "the law of the burnt offering" intimates one law for all burnt offerings: if they were placed on the altar, they were not removed. Rabbi Simeon taught that this law applied to animals that were slaughtered at night, whose blood was spilled, or whose blood passed out of the curtains, or whose flesh spent the night away from the altar, or whose flesh went out, or was unclean, or was slaughtered with the intention of burning its flesh after time or out of bounds, or whose blood was received and sprinkled by unfit priests, or whose blood was applied below the scarlet line when it should have been applied above, or whose blood was applied above when it should have been applied below, or whose blood was applied outside when it should have been applied within, or whose blood was applied within when it should have been applied outside, or a Passover-offering or a sin-offering that one slaughtered for a different purpose. Rabbi Simeon suggested that one might think that law would also include an animal used for bestiality, set aside for an idolatrous sacrifice or worshipped, a harlot's hire or the price of a dog (as referred to in Deuteronomy 23:19), or a mixed breed, or a trefah (a torn or otherwise disqualified animal), or an animal calved through a cesarean section. But Rabbi Simeon taught that the word "This" serves to exclude these. Rabbi Simeon explained that he included the former in the general rule because their disqualification arose in the sanctuary, while he excluded the latter because their disqualification did not arise in the sanctuary.

The Gemara taught that it is from the words of Leviticus 6:2, "upon the altar all night into the morning," that the Mishnah concludes that "the whole of the night is proper time for ... burning fat and limbs (on the altar)." And the Mishnah then set forth as a general rule: "Any commandment which is to be performed by night may be performed during the whole of the night."

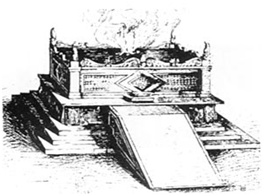
The Altar of the Tabernacle (illustration from the 1901 Standard Eclectic Commentary)

The Rabbis taught a story reflecting the importance of the regular offering required by Leviticus 6:2: When the Hasmonean brothers Hyrcanus and Aristobulus were contending with one another, and one was within Jerusalem's city wall and the other was outside, those within would let down a basket of money to their besiegers every day, and in return the besiegers would send up kosher animals for the regular sacrifices. But an older man among the besiegers argued that they could not be defeated as long as those within were allowed to continue to perform sacrifices. So, the next day, when those inside sent down the money basket, the besiegers sent up a pig. When the pig reached the center of the wall, it stuck its hooves into the wall, and an earthquake shook the entire Land of Israel. On that occasion, the Rabbis cursed those who bred pigs.

It was taught in the name of Rabbi Nehemiah that in obedience to Leviticus 6:2, the Israelites kept the fire burning on the altar for about 116 years. Yet, the wood of the altar did not burn, and the brass did not melt, even though it was taught in the name of Rabbi Hoshaiah that the metal was only as thick as a coin.

Rabbi Levi read Leviticus 6:2 homiletically to mean: "This is the law regarding a person striving to be high: It is that it goes up on its burning place." Thus, Rabbi Levi read the verse to teach that a person who behaves boastfully should be punished by fire.

A Midrash deduced the importance of peace from the way that the listing of the individual sacrifices in Leviticus 6–7 concludes with the peace offering. Leviticus 6:2–6 gives "the law of the burnt-offering," Leviticus 6:7–11 gives "the law of the meal-offering," Leviticus 6:18–23 gives "the law of the sin-offering," Leviticus 7:1–7 gives "the law of the guilt-offering," and Leviticus 7:11–21 gives "the law of the sacrifice of peace-offerings." Similarly, the Midrash found evidence for the importance of peace in the summary of Leviticus 7:37, which concludes with "the sacrifice of the peace offering."

Rabbi Judah the Levite, the son of Rabbi Shalom, taught that God's arrangements are not like those of mortals. For example, the cook of a human master dons fair apparel when going out but puts on ragged things and an apron when working in the kitchen. Moreover, when sweeping the stove or oven, the cook wears even worse clothing. But in God's presence, when the priest swept the altar and removed the ashes from it, he donned fine garments, as Leviticus 6:3 says: "And the priest shall put on his linen garment," so that "he shall take up the ashes." This is to teach that pride has no place with the Omnipresent.

A Baraita interpreted the term "his fitted linen garment" (מִדּוֹ, mido) in Leviticus 6:3 to teach that each priestly garment in Exodus 28 had to be fitted to the particular priest, and had to be neither too short nor too long.

The Gemara interpreted the words "upon his body" in Leviticus 6:3 to teach that there would be nothing between the priest's body and his priestly garment.

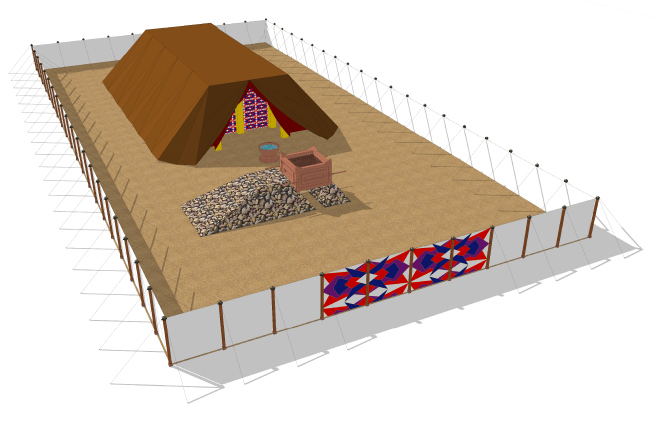
The Tabernacle, with the laver and altar (2009 illustration by Gabriel L. Fink)

Elaborating on the procedure in Leviticus 6:3–4 for removing ash from the altar, the Mishnah taught that the priests would get up early and cast lots for the right to remove the ashes. The priest who won the right to clear the ashes would prepare to do so. They warned him not to touch any vessel until he washed his hands and feet. No one entered with him. He did not carry any light but proceeded by the light of the altar fire. No one saw or heard a sound from him until they heard the noise of the wooden wheel Ben Katin made for the laver. When they told him the time had come, he washed his hands and feet with water from the laver, took the silver fire pan, went to the top of the altar, cleared away the cinders on either side and scooped up the ashes in the center. He then came down, and when he reached the floor, he turned to the north (toward the altar) and went along the east side of the ramp for about ten cubits, and he then piled the cinders on the pavement three handbreadths away from the ramp, in the place where they used to put the crop of the birds, the ashes from the inner altar, and the ash from the menorah.

Rabbi Joḥanan called his garments "my honor." Rabbi Aha bar Abba said in Rabbi Joḥanan's name that Leviticus 6:4, "And he shall put off his garments, and put on other garments," teaches that a change of garments is an act of honor in the Torah. The School of Rabbi Ishmael taught that the Torah teaches us manners: In the garments in which one cooks a dish for one's master, one should not pour a cup of wine for one's master. Rabbi Hiyya bar Abba said in Rabbi Joḥanan's name that it is a disgrace for a scholar to go into the marketplace with patched shoes. The Gemara objected that Rabbi Aha bar Hanina went out that way; Rabbi Aha, son of Rav Naḥman, clarified that the prohibition is of patches upon patches. Rabbi Hiyya bar Abba also said in Rabbi Joḥanan's name that any scholar who has a grease stain on a garment is worthy of death, for Wisdom says in Proverbs 8:36, "All they that hate me (מְשַׂנְאַי, mesanne'ai) love (merit) death," and we should read not מְשַׂנְאַי, mesanne'ai, but משׂניאי, masni'ai (that make me hated, that is, despised). Thus, a scholar who has no pride in personal appearance brings contempt upon learning. Ravina taught that this was stated about a thick patch (or, others say, a bloodstain). The Gemara harmonized the two opinions by teaching that one referred to an outer garment, the other to an undergarment. Rabbi Hiyya bar Abba also said in Rabbi Joḥanan's name that in Isaiah 20:3, "As my servant Isaiah walked naked and barefoot," "naked" means in worn-out garments, and "barefoot" means in patched shoes.

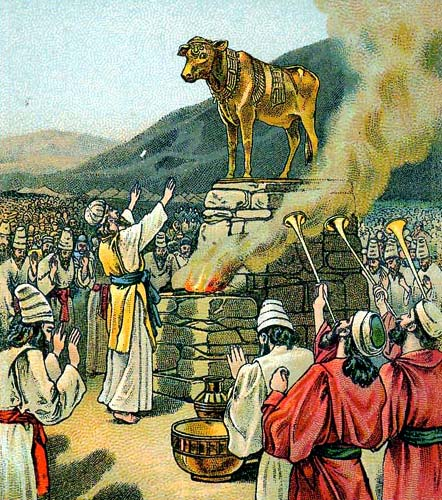
Worshiping the Golden Calf (illustration from a Bible card published 1901 by the Providence Lithograph Company)

Tractate Menachot in the Mishnah, Tosefta, and Babylonian Talmud interpreted the law of meal offerings in Leviticus 6:7–16.

The Rabbis taught that through the word "this," Aaron became degraded, as it is said in Exodus 32:22–24, "And Aaron said: '. . . I cast it into the fire, and there came out this calf,'" and through the word "this," Aaron was also elevated, as it is said in Leviticus 6:13, "This is the offering of Aaron and of his sons, which they shall offer to the Lord on the day when he is anointed" to become High Priest.

And noting the similarity of language between "This is the sacrifice of Aaron" in Leviticus 6:13 and "This is the sacrifice of Nahshon the son of Amminadab" and each of the other princes of the 12 tribes in Numbers 7:17–83, the Rabbis concluded that Aaron's sacrifice was as beloved to God as the sacrifices of the princes of the 12 tribes.

A Midrash noted that the commandment of Leviticus 6:13 that Aaron offer sacrifices paralleled Samson's riddle "out of the eater came forth food", for Aaron was to eat the sacrifices, and by virtue of Leviticus 6:13, a sacrifice was to come from him.

=== Leviticus chapter 7 ===
A Midrash read the words of Psalm 50:23, "Whoso offers the sacrifice of thanksgiving honors Me," to teach that the thanksgiving offerings of Leviticus 7:12 honored God more than sin offerings or guilt offerings. Rabbi Huna said in the name of Rabbi Aha that Psalm 50:23 taught that one who gave a thanksgiving offering gave God honor upon honor. Rabbi Berekiah said in the name of Rabbi Abba bar Kahana that the donor honored God in this world and will honor God in the World to Come. The continuation of Psalm 50:23, "to him who sets right the way," refers to those who clear stones from roads. Alternatively, the Midrash taught that it refers to teachers of Scripture and the Oral Law who sincerely instruct the young. Alternatively, Jose ben Judah said in the name of Rabbi Menahem, the son of Rabbi Jose, that it refers to shopkeepers who sell produce that has already been tithed. Alternatively, the Midrash taught that it refers to people who light lamps to provide light for the public.

Rabbi Phinehas compared the thanksgiving offerings of Leviticus 7:12 to the case of a king whose tenants and intimates came to pay him honor. From his tenants and entourage, the king merely collected their tribute. But when another who was neither a tenant nor a member of the king's entourage came to offer him homage, the king offered him a seat. Thus, Rabbi Phinehas read Leviticus 7:12 homiletically, which means: "If it be for a thanksgiving, He [God] will bring him [the offerer] near [to God]." Rabbi Phinehas, Rabbi Levi, and Rabbi Joḥanan said in the name of Rabbi Menahem of Gallia that in the Time to Come, all sacrifices will be annulled, but the thanksgiving sacrifice of Leviticus 7:12 will not be annulled, and all prayers will be annulled, but the Thanksgiving (מוֹדִים, Modim) prayer will not be annulled.

In reading the requirement of Leviticus 7:12 for the loaves of the thanksgiving sacrifice, the Mishnah interpreted that if one made them for oneself, then they were exempt from the requirement to separate challah, but if one made them to sell in the market, then they were subject to the requirement to separate challah.

The Mishnah taught that a vow offering, as in Leviticus 7:16, was when one said, "It is incumbent upon me to bring a burnt offering" (without specifying a particular animal). A freewill offering was when one said, "This animal shall serve as a burnt offering" (specifying a particular animal). In the case of vow offerings, one was responsible for the replacement of the animal if the animal died or was stolen, but in the case of freewill obligations, one was not held responsible for the animal's replacement if the specified animal died or was stolen.

Rabbi Eliezer taught that the prohibition of eating the meat of a peace offering on the third day in Leviticus 7:18 also applied to invalidate the sacrifice of one who merely intended to eat sacrificial meat on the third day.

The Sages taught that one may trust butchers to remove chelev, the fat that Leviticus 3:17 and 7:23 forbid.

Rabbi Berekiah said in the name of Rabbi Isaac that in the Time to Come, God will make a banquet for God's righteous servants, and whoever had not eaten meat from an animal that died other than through ritual slaughtering (נְבֵלָה, neveilah, prohibited by Leviticus 17:1–4) in this world will have the privilege of enjoying it in the World to Come. This is indicated by Leviticus 7:24, which says, "And the fat of that which dies of itself (נְבֵלָה, neveilah) and the fat of that which is torn by beasts (טְרֵפָה, tereifah), may be used for any other service, but you shall not eat it," so that one might eat it in the Time to Come. (By one's present self-restraint, one might merit partaking in the banquet in the Hereafter.) For this reason, Moses admonished the Israelites in Leviticus 11:2, "This is the animal that you shall eat."

A Baraita explained how the priests performed the waiving. A priest placed the sacrificial portions on the palm of his hand, the breast and thigh on top of the sacrificial portions, and whenever there was a bread offering, the bread on top of the breast and thigh. Rav Papa found authority for the Baraita's teaching in Leviticus 8:26–27, which states that they placed the bread on top of the thigh. And the Gemara noted that Leviticus 10:15 implies that the breast and thigh were on top of the offerings of fat. But the Gemara noted that Leviticus 7:30 says the priest "shall bring the fat upon the breast." Abaye reconciled the verses by explaining that Leviticus 7:30 refers to how the priest brought the parts from the slaughtering place. The priest then turned them over and placed them into the hands of a second priest, who waived them. Noting further that Leviticus 9:20 says that "they put the fat upon the breasts," the Gemara deduced that this second priest then handed the parts over to a third priest, who burned them. The Gemara thus concluded that these verses taught that three priests were required for this part of the service, giving effect to the teaching of Proverbs 14:28, "In the multitude of people is the king's glory."

Rabbi Aha compared the listing of Leviticus 7:37 to a ruler who entered a province, escorting many bands of robbers as captives. Upon seeing the scene, one citizen expressed his fear of the ruler. A second citizen answered that they had no reason to fear if their conduct was good. Similarly, when the Israelites heard the section of the Torah dealing with sacrifices, they became afraid. But Moses told them not to be afraid; if they occupied themselves with the Torah, they would have no reason to fear.

A Midrash asked why Leviticus 7:37 mentions peace offerings last in its list of sacrifices and suggested that it was because there are many kinds of peace offerings. Rabbi Simon said that assorted desserts always come last because they consist of many kinds of things.

Noting that Leviticus 7:37–38 says that "This is the law . . . that the Lord commanded Moses in Mount Sinai," Rabbi Judah ben Bathyra counted Leviticus 7:38 among 13 limiting phrases recorded in the Torah to inform us that God spoke not to Aaron but to Moses with instruction that he should tell Aaron. Rabbi Judah ben Bathyra taught that these 13 limiting phrases correspond to and limit 13 Divine communications recorded in the Torah as having been made to both Moses and Aaron.

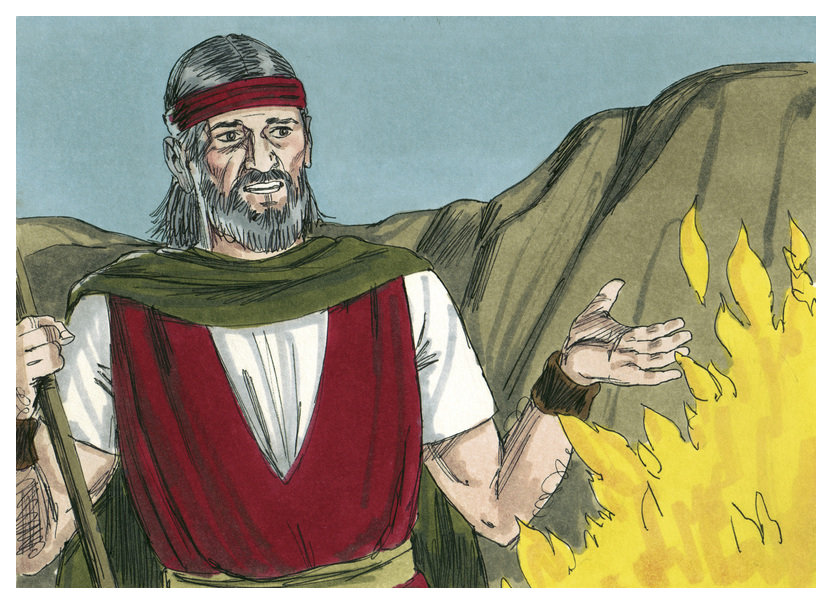
Moses said, “How can I bring the Israelites out of Egypt?” (1984 illustration by Jim Padgett, courtesy of Distant Shores Media/Sweet Publishing)

=== Leviticus chapter 8 ===
Rabbi Samuel bar Naḥman taught that Moses first incurred his fate of dying in the wilderness from his conduct at the Burning Bush, for there God tried for seven days to persuade Moses to go on his errand to Egypt, as Exodus 4:10 says, “And Moses said to the Lord: ‘Oh Lord, I am not a man of words, neither yesterday, nor the day before, nor since you have spoken to your servant’” (which the Midrash interpreted to indicate seven days of conversation). And in the end, Moses told God in Exodus 4:13, "Send, I pray, by the hand of him whom You will send." God replied that God would keep this in store for Moses. Rabbi Berekiah, in Rabbi Levi's name, and Rabbi Helbo give different answers on when God repaid Moses. One said that during all seven days of the consecration of the priesthood in Leviticus 8, Moses functioned as a high priest, and he came to think that the office belonged to him. But in the end, God told Moses that the job was not his, but his brother's, as Leviticus 9:1 says, “And it came to pass on the eighth day, that Moses called Aaron.” The other taught that all the first seven days of Adar of the fortieth year, Moses beseeched God to enter the Promised Land, but in the end, God told him in Deuteronomy 3:27, “You shall not go over this Jordan.”

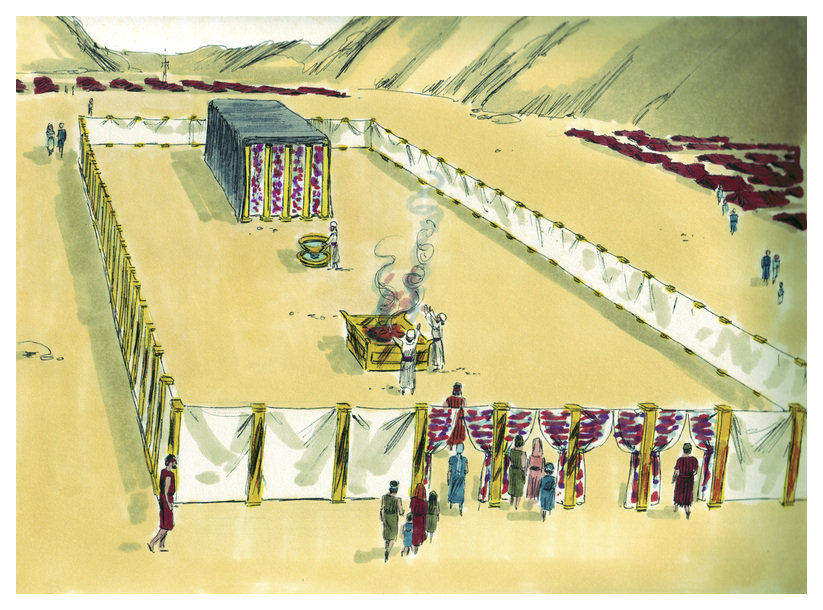
The Tabernacle Courtyard (1984 illustration by Jim Padgett, courtesy of Distant Shores Media/Sweet Publishing)

Rabbi Jose noted that even though Exodus 27:18 reported that the Tabernacle's courtyard was just 100 cubits by 50 cubits (about 150 feet by 75 feet), a little space held a lot, as Leviticus 8:3 implied that the space miraculously held the entire Israelite people.

The Tosefta deduced from the congregation's placement in Leviticus 8:4 that in a synagogue, as well, the people face toward the sanctuary.

The Mishnah taught that the High Priest inquired of the Urim and Thummim, as noted in Leviticus 8:8, only for the king, for the court, or for one whom the community needed.

A Baraita explained why the Urim and Thummim noted in Leviticus 8:8 were called by those names: The term "Urim" is like the Hebrew word for "lights," and thus it was called "Urim" because it enlightened. The term "Thummim" is like the Hebrew word tam meaning "to be complete," and thus, it was called "Thummim" because its predictions were fulfilled. The Gemara discussed how they used the Urim and Thummim: Rabbi Joḥanan said that the letters of the stones in the breastplate stood out to spell out the answer. Resh Lakish said that the letters joined each other to spell words. But the Gemara noted that the Hebrew letter צ, tsade, was missing from the list of the 12 tribes of Israel. Rabbi Samuel bar Isaac said that the stones of the breastplate also contained the names of Abraham, Isaac, and Jacob. But the Gemara noted that the Hebrew letter ט, teth, was also missing. Rav Aha bar Jacob said that they also contained the words: "The tribes of Jeshurun." The Gemara taught that although the decree of a prophet could be revoked, the decree of the Urim and Thummim could not be revoked, as Numbers 27:21 says, "By the judgment of the Urim."

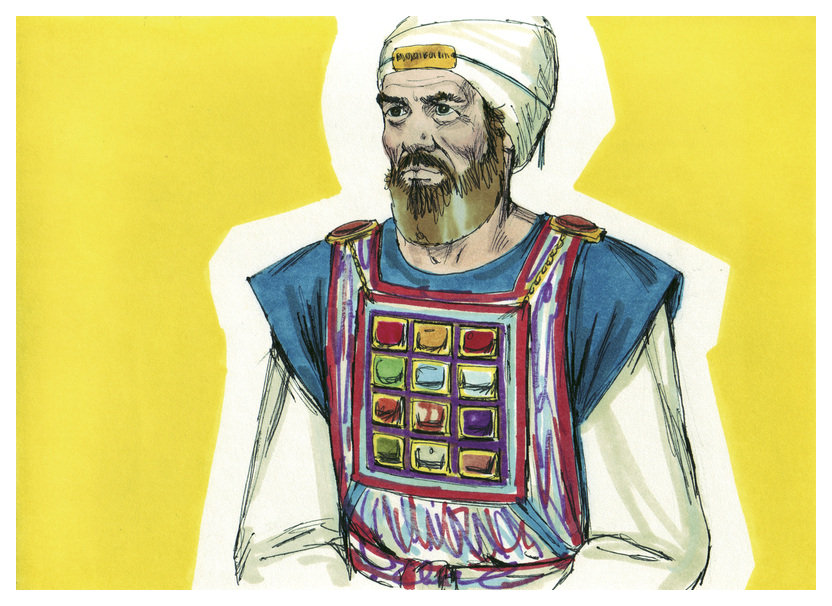
The High Priest wearing his Breastplate (1984 illustration by Jim Padgett, courtesy of Distant Shores Media/Sweet Publishing)

The Pirke De-Rabbi Eliezer taught that when Israel sinned in the matter of the devoted things, as reported in Joshua 7:11, Joshua looked at the 12 stones corresponding to the 12 tribes that were upon the High Priest's breastplate. For every tribe that had sinned, the light of its stone became dim, and Joshua saw that the stone's light for the tribe of Judah had become dim. So Joshua knew that the tribe of Judah had transgressed in the matter of the devoted things. Similarly, the Pirke De-Rabbi Eliezer taught that Saul saw the Philistines turning against Israel, and he knew that Israel had sinned in the matter of the ban. Saul looked at the 12 stones, and for each tribe that had followed the law, its stone (on the High Priest's breastplate) shined with its light, and for each tribe that had transgressed, the light of its stone was dim. So Saul knew that the tribe of Benjamin had trespassed in the matter of the ban.

The Mishnah reported that with the death of the former prophets, the Urim and Thummim ceased. In this connection, the Gemara reported differing views of who the former prophets were. Rav Huna said they were David, Samuel, and Solomon. Rav Naḥman noted that during the days of David, they were sometimes successful and sometimes not (getting an answer from the Urim and Thummim), for Zadok consulted it and succeeded, while Abiathar consulted it and was not successful, as 2 Samuel 15:24 reports, "And Abiathar went up." (He retired from the priesthood because the Urim and Thummim gave him no reply.) Rabbah bar Samuel asked whether the report of 2 Chronicles 26:5, "And he (King Uzziah of Judah) set himself to seek God all the days of Zechariah, who had understanding in the vision of God," did not refer to the Urim and Thummim. But the Gemara answered that Uzziah did so through Zechariah's prophecy. A Baraita said that when the first Temple was destroyed, the Urim and Thummim ceased, and explained Ezra 2:63 (reporting events after the Jews returned from the Babylonian Captivity), "And the governor said to them that they should not eat of the most holy things till there stood up a priest with Urim and Thummim," as a reference to the remote future, as when one speaks of the time of the Messiah. Rav Naḥman concluded that the term "former prophets" referred to a period before Haggai, Zechariah, and Malachi, who were among the latter prophets. And the Jerusalem Talmud taught that the "former prophets" referred to Samuel and David, and thus the Urim and Thummim did not function in the period of the First Temple, either.

The Gemara taught that the early scholars were called soferim (related to the original sense of its root safar, "to count") because they used to count all the letters of the Torah (to ensure the correctness of the text). They used to say the vav (ו) in גָּחוֹן, gachon ("belly"), in Leviticus 11:42 marks the half-way point of the letters in the Torah. (And in a Torah Scroll, scribes write that vav (ו) larger than the surrounding letters.) They used to say the words דָּרֹשׁ דָּרַשׁ, darosh darash ("diligently inquired"), in Leviticus 10:16 mark the half-way point of the words in the Torah. And they used to say Leviticus 13:33 marks the halfway point of the verses in the Torah. Rav Joseph asked whether the vav (ו) in גָּחוֹן, gachon ("belly"), in Leviticus 11:42 belonged to the first half or the second half of the Torah. (Rav Joseph presumed that the Torah contains an even number of letters.) The scholars replied that they could bring a Torah Scroll and count, for Rabbah bar bar Hana said on a similar occasion that they did not stir from where they were until a Torah Scroll was brought, and they counted. Rav Joseph replied that they (in Rabbah bar bar Hanah's time) were thoroughly versed in the proper defective and full spellings of words (that could be spelled in variant ways), but they (in Rav Joseph's time) were not. Similarly, Rav Joseph asked whether Leviticus 13:33 belongs to the first or second half of verses. Abaye replied that for verses, we can at least bring a scroll and count them. But Rav Joseph replied that they could no longer be certain even with verses. For when Rav Aha bar Adda came (from the Land of Israel to Babylon), he said that in the West (in the Land of Israel), they divided Exodus 19:9 into three verses. Nonetheless, the Rabbis taught in a Baraita that there are 5,888 verses in the Torah. (Note that others say the middle letter in our current Torah text is the aleph (א) in הוּא, hu ("he") in Leviticus 8:28; the middle two words are אֶל-יְסוֹד, el yesod ("at the base of") in Leviticus 8:15; the half-way point of the verses in the Torah is Leviticus 8:7; and there are 5,846 verses in the Torah text we have today.)

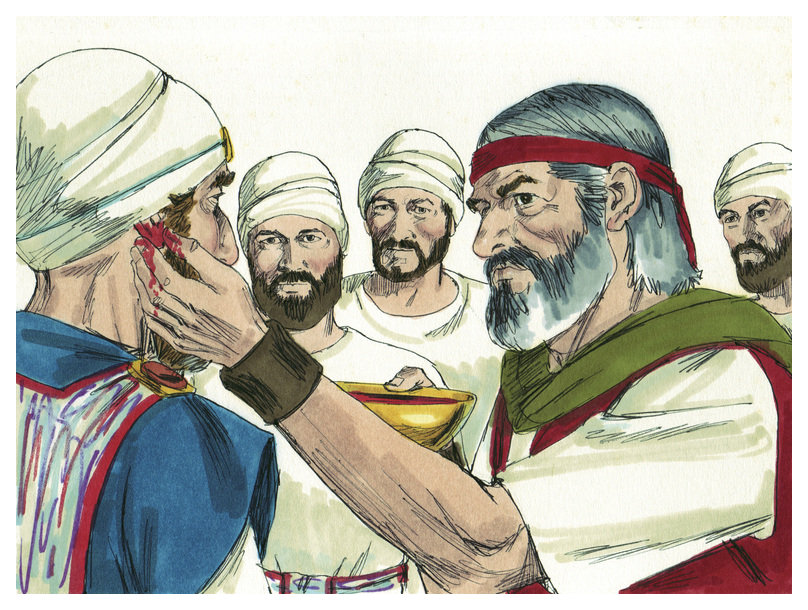
Moses Put the Blood on Aaron's Right Ear (1984 illustration by Jim Padgett, courtesy of Distant Shores Media/Sweet Publishing)

The Sifra taught that the words "and put it upon the tip of Aaron's right ear" in Leviticus 8:23 refer to the middle ridge of the ear. And the Sifra taught that the words "and upon the thumb of his right hand" in Leviticus 8:23 refer to the middle knuckle.

A Master said in a Baraita that using the thumb for service in Leviticus 8:23–24 and 14:14, 17, 25, and 28 showed that every finger has its own unique purpose.

Rabbi Jacob bar Acha taught in the name of Rabbi Zorah that the command to Aaron in Leviticus 8:35, "at the door of the tent of meeting shall you abide day and night seven days, and keep the charge of the Lord," served as a source for the law of seven days of mourning for the death of a relative (שִׁבְעָה, shivah). Rabbi Jacob bar Acha interpreted Moses to tell Aaron that just as God observed seven days of mourning for the then-upcoming destruction of the world at the time of the Flood of Noah, so too Aaron would observe seven days of mourning for the upcoming death of his sons Nadab and Abihu. We know that God observed seven days of mourning for the world's destruction by the Flood from Genesis 7:10, which says, "And it came to pass after the seven days, that the waters of the Flood were upon the earth." The Gemara asked whether one mourns before death, as Jacob bar Acha appears to argue that this happened in these two cases. In reply, the Gemara distinguished between the mourning of God and people: People who do not know what will happen until it happens do not mourn until the deceased dies. But God, who knows what will happen in the future, mourned for the world before its destruction. The Gemara noted, however, that some say that the seven days before the Flood were days of mourning for Methuselah (who died just before the Flood).

Similarly, reading in Leviticus 9:1 that "it came to pass on the eighth day," a Midrash recounted how Moses told Aaron in Leviticus 8:33, "You shall not go out from the door of the tent of meeting seven days." The Midrash interpreted this to mean that Moses thereby told Aaron and his sons to observe the laws of mourning for seven days before they would affect them. Moses told them in Leviticus 8:35 that they were to "keep the charge of the Lord," for so God had kept seven days of mourning before God brought the Flood, as Genesis 7:10 reports, "And it came to pass after the seven days, that the waters of the Flood were upon the earth." The Midrash deduced that God was mourning by noting that Genesis 6:6 reports, "And it repented the Lord that He had made man on the earth, and it grieved Him (וַיִּתְעַצֵּב, vayitatzeiv) at His heart." And 2 Samuel 19:3 uses the same word to express mourning when it says, "The king grieves (נֶעֱצַב, ne'etzav) for his son." After God told Moses in Exodus 29:43, "And there I will meet with the children of Israel; and [the Tabernacle] shall be sanctified by My glory," Moses administered the service for seven days in fear, fearing that God would strike him down. And it was for that reason that Moses told Aaron to observe the laws of mourning. When Aaron asked Moses why, Moses replied (in Leviticus 8:35), "So I am commanded." Then, as reported in Leviticus 10:2, God struck Nadab and Abihu instead. Thus, in Leviticus 10:3, Moses told Aaron that he finally understood, "This is what the Lord meant when He said: ‘Through those near to Me I show Myself holy, and gain glory before all the people.'"

== In medieval Jewish interpretation ==
The parashah is discussed in these medieval Jewish sources:

=== Leviticus chapters 1–7 ===
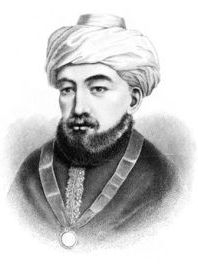
Maimonides

Maimonides and Naḥmanides differed about the reason for the sacrificial system. Maimonides wrote that the reason for the offerings was that when the Israelites lived in Egypt and Chaldea, the Egyptians worshipped sheep, and the Chaldeans worshipped demons in the form of goats. And people in India never slaughter cattle. Thus, God commanded the Israelites to slaughter cattle, sheep, and goats to God so that worshipers of the other lands would know that God required the very act that they considered to be the utmost sin, and through that act, God would forgive Israel's sins. God thus intended to cure the people of the other nations of false beliefs, which Maimonides characterized as diseases of the soul, for diseases are healed by medicines that are antithetical to the diseases.

Maimonides taught that God instituted the practice of sacrifices as a transitional step to wean the Israelites off of the worship of the times and move them toward prayer as the primary means of worship. Maimonides noted that in nature, God created animals that develop gradually. For example, when a mammal is born, it is extremely tender and cannot eat dry food, so God provided breasts that yield milk to feed the young animal until it can eat dry food. Similarly, Maimonides taught that God instituted many laws as temporary measures, as it would have been impossible for the Israelites to suddenly discontinue everything to which they had become accustomed. So God sent Moses to make the Israelites (in the words of Exodus 19:6) "a kingdom of priests and a holy nation." However, in those days, the general custom of worship was sacrificing animals in temples that contained idols. So, God did not command the Israelites to give up those manners of service but allowed them to continue. God transferred to God's service what had formerly served as a worship of idols and commanded the Israelites to serve God in the same manner—namely, to build a Sanctuary (Exodus 25:8), to erect the altar to God's name (Exodus 20:21), to offer sacrifices to God (Leviticus 1:2), to bow down to God, and to burn incense before God. God forbade doing any of these things to any other being and selected priests for the service in the temple in Exodus 28:41. By this Divine plan, God blotted out the traces of idolatry and established the great principle of the Existence and Unity of God. But the sacrificial service, Maimonides taught, was not the primary object of God's commandments about sacrifice; instead, supplications, prayers, and similar kinds of worship are nearer to the primary object. Thus, God limited sacrifice to only one temple (see Deuteronomy 12:26) and the priesthood to only the members of a particular family. These restrictions, Maimonides taught, served to limit sacrificial worship and kept it within such bounds that God did not feel it necessary to abolish sacrificial service altogether. But in the Divine plan, prayer and supplication can be offered everywhere and by every person, as can be the wearing of tzitzit (Numbers 15:38) and tefillin (Exodus 13:9, 16) and similar kinds of service.

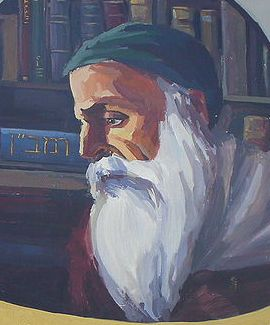
Naḥmanides

Naḥmanides noted that Leviticus 3:16 mentioned a reason for the offerings: they are "a fire-offering, of a pleasing odor to the Eternal." Naḥmanides rejected the argument that the offerings were meant to eliminate the foreigners' foolish ideas, for the sacrifices would not have that effect, as the foreigners intended to worship the constellations of the sheep and the ox. If Jews slaughtered sheep and oxen to God, it would show respect and honor to those constellations. Naḥmanides further noted that when Noah came out of the ark, there were as yet no Chaldeans or Egyptians in the world, yet Noah brought an offering that pleased God so much that Genesis 8:21 reports that on its account, God said, "I will not again curse the ground anymore for man's sake." Similarly, Abel brought the firstborn of his flock, and Genesis 4:4 reports that "the Eternal had regard to Abel and to his offering," but there had not yet been a trace of idol worship in the world. In Numbers 23:4, Balaam said, "I have prepared the seven altars, and I have offered up a bullock and a ram on every altar," but his intent was not to eradicate evil beliefs from Balak's mind, but rather to approach God so that God's communication would reach Balaam. Naḥmanides argued that the reason for the offerings was more likely that since people's deeds are accomplished through thought, speech, and action, God commanded that when people sin and bring an offering, they should lay their hands on it in contrast to the evil deed they committed. Offerers would confess their sins verbally to contrast with their evil speech. They would burn parts of the animal in a fire, which is seen as the instrument of thought and desire in human beings. The offerers would burn the legs of the animal because they corresponded to the limbs with which the offerer acted. The offerer sprinkled blood on the altar, which is analogous to the blood in the offerer's body. Naḥmanides argued that offerers performed these acts so that the offerers should realize that the offerers had sinned against God with their bodies. And the offerer's soul and blood should have been spilled and the offerer's body burned, were it not for God's loving-kindness in taking a substitute and a ransom—the offering—so that the offering's blood should be in place of the offerer's blood, its life in place of the offerer's life, and that the limbs of the offering in place of the parts of the offerer's body.

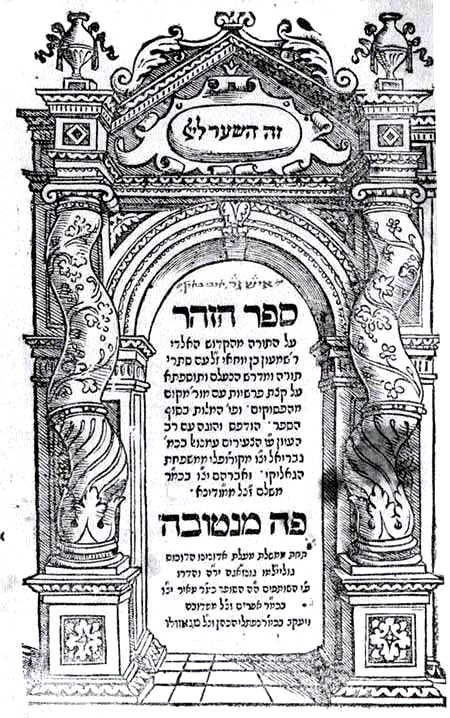
The Zohar

=== Leviticus chapter 8 ===
The Zohar taught that Aaron had to purge himself during the seven sacred days of Leviticus 8:33 and, after that, employ the calf that Leviticus 9:2 directed. The Zohar observed that Aaron had to purge himself, but the Golden Calf would not have emerged for him.

== In modern interpretation ==
The parashah is discussed in these modern sources:

=== Leviticus chapters 6–7 ===
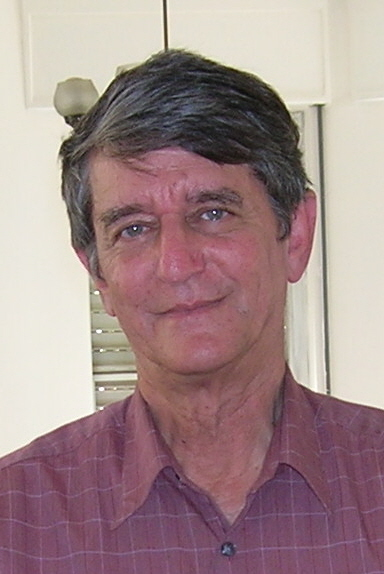
Kugel

James Kugel reported that ancient texts offered several explanations for why peoples of the ancient Near East sacrificed animals: to provide the deity food (see Numbers 28:2), to offer the life of the slaughtered animal as a substitute for the offerer's; to give a costly possession as a sign of fealty or in the hope of receiving still more generous compensation from the deity. Kugel reported that more recent explanations saw the sacrifice as establishing a tangible connection between the sacrificer and the deity. In contrast, others stress the connection of the sacred with violence or see the function of religion as defusing violence that would otherwise be directed at people. Kugel argued that the Israelites conceived of animal sacrifices as the principal channel of communication between the people and God. William Hallo described sacrifice as a sacred-making of the human consumption of animal meat that followed.

Jacob Milgrom read the sacrificial system in the parashah to describe the forces of life and death pitted against each other in a cosmic struggle, set loose by people through their obedience to or defiance of God's commandments. Milgrom taught that Leviticus treats impurity as the opposite of holiness, identifying impurity with death and holiness with life. Milgrom interpreted Leviticus to teach that people could drive God out of the sanctuary by polluting it with their moral and ritual sins. But the priests could periodically purge the sanctuary of its impurities and influence the people to atone. The blood of the purification offerings symbolically purged the sanctuary by absorbing its impurities, in a victory for life over death.

		◄SACRIFICE◄		
	◄sanctify◄		◄cleanse◄	
HOLY		CLEAN		UNCLEAN
	►profane►		►pollute►	
		►SIN and INFIRMITY►		

Similarly, Wenham noted that the sacrificial system regularly associates sacrifices with cleansing and sanctification. Wenham read Leviticus to teach that sacrificial blood was necessary to cleanse and sanctify. Sacrifice could undo the effects of sin and human infirmity. Sin and disease profaned the holy and polluted the clean, whereas sacrifice could reverse this process. Wenham illustrated with the chart at right. Wenham concluded that contact between the holy and the unclean resulted in death. Sacrifice, by cleansing the unclean, made such contact possible. Sacrifice thus allowed the holy God to meet with sinful man.

Mary Douglas wrote that to find the underlying logic of the first chapters of Leviticus about how to make a sacrifice and how to lay out the animal sections on the altar, one needs to look carefully at what Leviticus says about bodies and parts of bodies, what is inner and outer, and what is on top and underneath. Douglas suggested this alignment of the three levels of Mount Sinai, the animal sacrifice, and the Tabernacle:

Mount Sinai	Animal Offering	Tabernacle
Summit or head, cloud-like smoke (Exodus 19:18); God came down to the top; access for Moses (Exodus 19:20–22).	Entrails, intestines, and genital organs (washed) at the summit of the pile.	Holy of Holies, cherubim, Ark, and Testimony of Covenant.
Perimeter of dense cloud; access restricted to Aaron, two sons, and 70 elders (Exodus 24:1–9).	Midriff area, dense fat covering, kidneys, liver lobe, burnt on the altar.	Sanctuary, dense clouds of incense, symmetrical table and lampstand, restricted to priests.
Lower slopes, open access.	Head and meat sections, access to the body, food for people and priests.	Outer court, main altar, access for people.
Mountain consecrated (Exodus 19:23).	Animal consecrated (Leviticus 1–7).	Tabernacle consecrated (Leviticus 16).

Douglas argued that the Tabernacle ran horizontally toward the most sacred area, Mount Sinai went up vertically to the summit, and the sacrificial pile started with the head underneath and went up to the entrails, and one can interpret each by reference to the others. Douglas noted that “upper” and “inner” can be equivalent in mystical thought. The pattern is always there throughout creation, with God in the depths or heights of everything. Likening the tabernacle to a body, the innards corresponded to the Holy of Holies, for the Bible locates the emotions and thought in the innermost parts of the body; the loins are wrung with remorse or grief; God scrutinizes the innermost part; compassion resides in the bowels. The Tabernacle was associated with creation and creation with fertility, implying that the innermost part of the Tabernacle was a Divine nuptial chamber, depicting the union between God and Israel. Douglas concluded that the summit of the mountain was God's abode; below was the cloudy region that only Moses could enter. The lower slopes were where the priests and congregation waited. Analogously, the order of placing the parts of the animal on the altar marked out three zones on the carcass, the suet set around and below the diaphragm corresponding to the cloud girdling the middle of the mountain.

Milgrom noted that Leviticus 6:1–7:21 sets forth some of the few laws (along with Leviticus 10:8–15 and 16:2–28) reserved for the Priests alone, while most of Leviticus is addressed to all the Israelite people.

Bernard Bamberger noted that while the Rabbis introduced into the synagogue a number of practices formerly associated with the Temple, they made no provision for "interim” sacrifices, even though they could have found precedents for sacrifice outside Jerusalem. When the Roman Empire destroyed the Jerusalem Temple, the Rabbis did not choose to follow those precedents for sacrifice elsewhere. Instead, they set up a substitute, declaring the study of the sacrificial laws acceptable to God as sacrifices. Bamberger suggested that some scholars may have felt the day of sacrifice had passed.

=== Leviticus chapter 8 ===
Reading Leviticus 8:23, Milgrom noted abundant attestation of ritual daubing in the ancient Near East. The incantations recited during the ritual smearing of persons, gods' statues, and buildings testify to a purificatory and apotropaic purpose—to wipe off and ward off menacing demonic forces. These ancient Near East applications always smear the vulnerable parts of bodies (extremities) and structures (corners, entrances) with magical substances. Milgrom concluded that the blood daubing of the altar's extremities—its horns—closely resembles the blood daubing of the extremities of the priests in Leviticus 8:23–24. Milgrom also noted the correspondence of the dedicatory rite of Ezekiel's altar to the daubing of the priests, for in Ezekiel 43:20, the purificatory blood is daubed not only on the altar's horns but also on the corners of its two gutters, located at its middle and bottom. Milgrom argued that these points correspond to a person's earlobe, thumb, and big toe. Milgrom concluded that these two rites shared the same purpose, evident in Ezekiel's altar. Ezekiel 43:20 made explicit: "And you shall decontaminate it and thus purge it." Similarly, Ezekiel 43:26 says that through it, "they shall purge the altar and thus purify it." Therefore, Milgrom concluded that the daubing of the priest at points of his body and the daubing of comparable points on the altar possessed a similar goal of purging.

Diagram of the Documentary Hypothesis

== In critical analysis ==
Scholars who follow the Documentary Hypothesis attribute the parashah to the Priestly source who wrote in the 6th or 5th century BCE.

== Commandments ==
According to the Sefer ha-Chinuch, there are 9 positive and 9 negative commandments in the parashah:

- To remove the ashes from the altar every day
- To light a fire on the altar every day
- Not to extinguish this fire
- The priests must eat the remains of the meal offerings.
- Not to bake a meal offering as leavened bread
- The High Priest must bring a meal offering every day.
- Not to eat the meal offering of the High Priest
- To carry out the procedure of the sin offering
- Not to eat the meat of the inner sin offering
- To carry out the procedure of the guilt offering
- To follow the procedure of the peace offering
- Not to allow any of the thanksgiving offering to remain until the morning
- To burn the leftover korbanot
- Not to eat from korbanot offered with improper intentions
- Not to eat from korbanot that became impure
- To burn all impure korbanot
- Not to eat fat that can be used for korbanot, (chelev)
- Not to eat blood

== In the liturgy ==
Many Jews read excerpts from and allusions to the instructions in the parashah as part of the readings on the offerings after the Sabbath morning blessings. Specifically, Jews read the instructions for the taking of the ashes in Leviticus 6:1–6, read the instructions for the offerings in Leviticus 6:5, and allude to the thanksgiving offerings of Leviticus 7:12.

The prohibition in Leviticus 7:19–20 of eating of sacrificial meat by anyone ritually contaminated provides an application of the eighth of the Thirteen Rules for interpreting the Torah in the Baraita of Rabbi Ishmael that many Jews read as part of the readings before the Pesukei d'Zimrah prayer service. The rule provides that an item included in a generalization that is then singled out to teach something is singled out not to teach only about that particular item but about the generalization in its entirety. Leviticus 7:19 prohibits the eating of sacrificial meat by anyone ritually contaminated, and Leviticus 7:20 then singles out the peace offering and states that a contaminated person who eats the peace offering is subject to excision (כָּרֵת, kareit). Applying the eighth rule teaches that the punishment of excision applies to a contaminated person who eats any of the offerings.

The role of Moses as a priest in Leviticus 8:14–30 is reflected in Psalm 99:6, which is in turn one of the six Psalms recited at the beginning of the Kabbalat Shabbat prayer service.

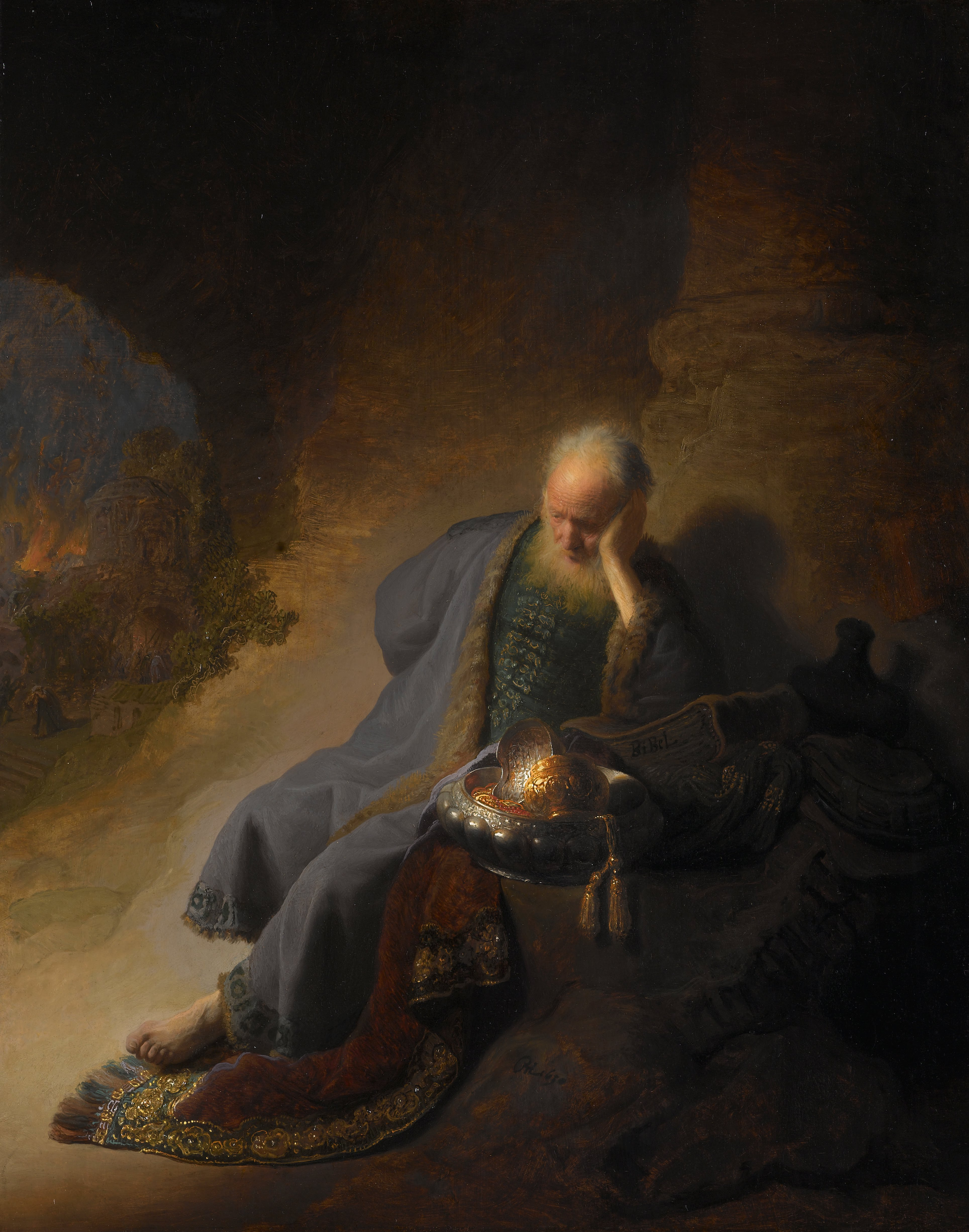
Jeremiah Lamenting the Destruction of Jerusalem (1630 painting by Rembrandt)

== Haftarah ==
=== Generally ===
The haftarah for the parashah is Jeremiah 7:21–8:3 and 9:22–23.

==== Connection to the Parashah ====
Both the parashah and the haftarah refer to the burnt offering (עֹלָה, olah) and sacrifice (זֶבַח, zevach). In the haftarah, Jeremiah spoke of the priority of obedience to God's law over ritual sacrifice alone.

=== On Shabbat HaGadol ===
When the parashah coincides with Shabbat HaGadol (the special Sabbath immediately before Passover—as it does in 2025, 2026, 2028, and 2029), the haftarah is Malachi 3:4–24. Shabbat HaGadol means "the Great Sabbath," and the haftarah for the special Sabbath refers to a great day that God is preparing.

=== On Shabbat Parah ===
When the parashah coincides with Shabbat Parah (the special Sabbath preceding Shabbat HaChodesh—as it does in 2024, 2027, and 2030), the haftarah is Ezekiel 36:16–38.

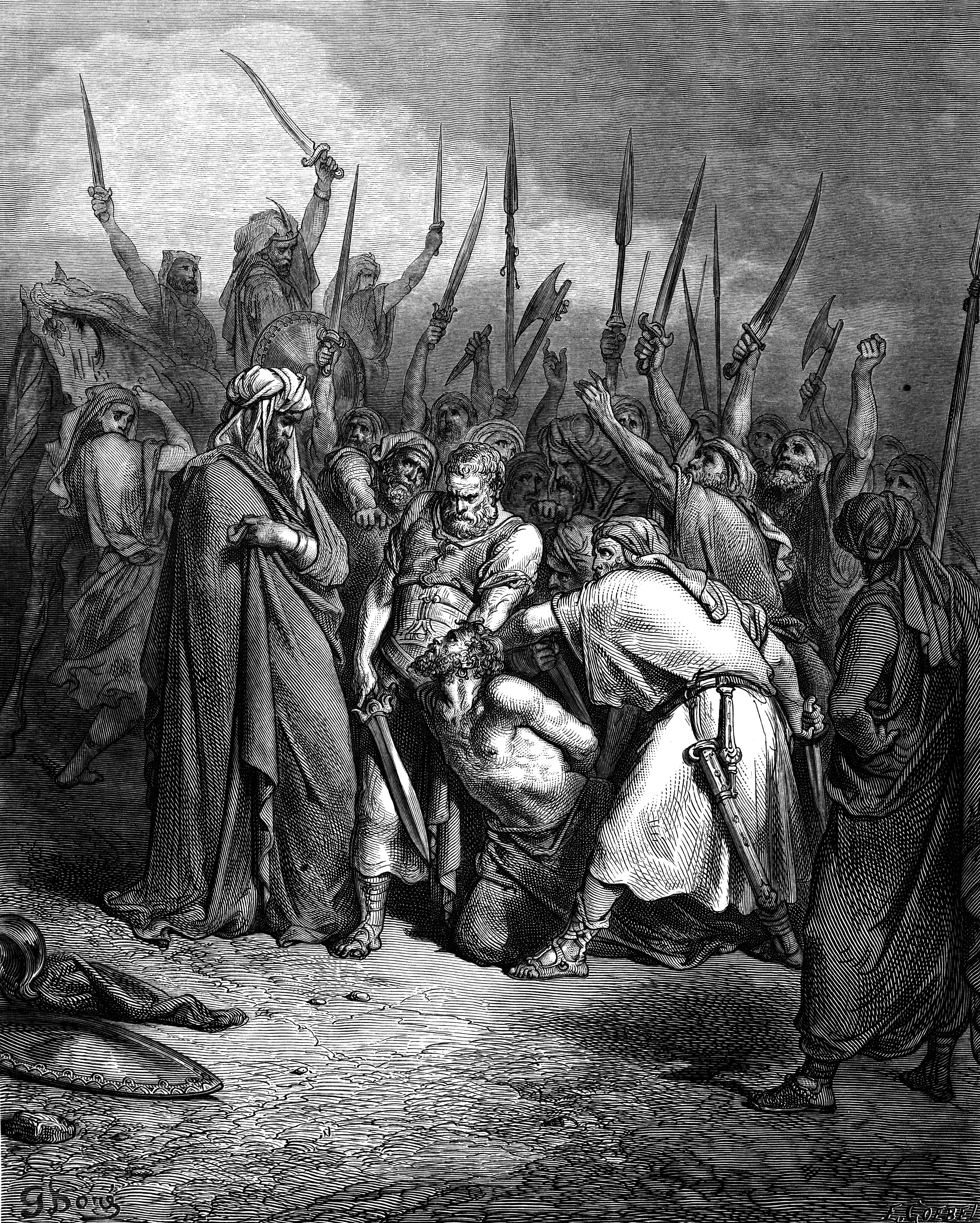
The Death of Agag (illustration by Gustave Doré).

=== On Shabbat Zachor ===
When the parashah coincides with Shabbat Zachor (the special Sabbath immediately preceding Purim—as it did in 2014), the haftarah is:

- for Ashkenazi Jews: 1 Samuel 15:2–34;
- for Sephardi Jews: 1 Samuel 15:1–34.

==== Connection to the Special Sabbath ====
On Shabbat Zachor, the Sabbath just before Purim, Jews read Deuteronomy 25:17–19, which instructs Jews: "Remember (zachor) what Amalek did" in attacking the Israelites. The haftarah for Shabbat Zachor, 1 Samuel 15:2–34 or 1–34, describes Saul's encounter with Amalek and Saul's and Samuel's treatment of the Amalekite king Agag. Purim, in turn, commemorates the story of Esther and the Jewish people's victory over Haman's plan to kill the Jews, told in the Book of Esther. Esther 3:1 identifies Haman as an Agagite, and thus a descendant of Amalek. Numbers 24:7 identifies the Agagites with the Amalekites. Alternatively, a Midrash tells the story that between King Agag's capture by Saul and his killing by Samuel, Agag fathered a child, from whom Haman in turn descended.
