= Old Hapoel Ground, Petah Tikva =

Football ground in Petah Tikva, Israel

- Interactive map of Old Hapoel Ground, Petah Tikva
- Full name: Old Hapoel Ground, Petah Tikva
- Location: Petah Tikva, Israel
- Coordinates: 32°4′49.3″N 34°53′13.5″E

Construction
- Opened: 1935
- Closed: 1940

Tenant
- Hapoel Petah Tikva (1935–1940)

Old Hapoel Ground, Petah Tikva (Hebrew: מגרש הפועל פתח תקווה הישן) was a football ground in Petah Tikva, at the corner of Jewish National Fund and Schapira streets. The ground was in use between 1935 and 1940, when the team moved to their new ground

== See also ==
- Sports in Israel
