= Baraita of the Forty-nine Rules =

The Baraita of the Forty-nine Rules (Hebrew: ברייתא מ"ט מדות) is a work of rabbinical literature which is no longer in existence except in references by later authorities. It is mentioned or cited by Rashi, the Tosafists, Abraham ibn Ezra, Yalḳut, and Asher ben Jehiel. Rashi on Exodus 26:5, Yalkut Shimoni Genesis 61, calls it "Midrash"; Rashi on Exodus 27:6 calls it "Mishnah".

== Authorship and character ==
Ibn Ezra mentions R. Nathan as the author of the Baraita. Zunz showed, by referring to a number of passages in the Talmud, that the tanna R. Nathan, in both halakhah and aggadah, was accustomed to group things arithmetically, and to arrange his sayings accordingly. On this basis, Zunz conjectured that "this lost work of R. Nathan contained a large portion of his Mishnah, and was arranged in rubrics from one to forty-nine; so that each rubric, under the introductory formula "Middah," mentioned halakhic, aggadic, and, in general, scientific subjects which belonged in that particular place in regard to number".

From the few fragments of this Baraita preserved by the above-mentioned authors, only one fact pertaining to its character can be ascertained, viz., that it contained aggadic as well as halakhic matter, especially halakhic topic which involve exact measurement; for instance, the measurement of the Tabernacle and its furnishings. If from these short fragments an opinion could be formed concerning the composition of the Baraita, Zunz's assumption would be justified that it contained aggadah and halakhah numerically arranged. Another assumption of his, however, that it represents the "Mishnat R. Nathan" mentioned elsewhere, is highly improbable; R. Nathan's Mishnah was in all likelihood only a version of Akiva's Mishnah differing from the authoritative Mishnah. Against Zunz's opinion, compare Eliakim Milsahagi.

== The Mishnat ha-Middot ==
Steinschneider believed that he had put an end to all conjecture concerning the Baraita through a happy find. In the introduction to an edition of Mishnat ha-Middot, he maintains that this mathematical work, edited by him, is identical with the Baraita under consideration. Were this the case, the Baraita would be a product of the 9th or, at earliest the 8th century, and its birthplace would have to be Babylonia. For, although the scientific terminology of this, the oldest, mathematical work of the Jews shows its origin to have been in a time previous to Arabic influences on Jewish scholarship, yet expressions like חץ = Arabic סהם ("arrow") for sinus versus, or משיחה = Arabic מסאחה for measure, area, show that the work could not have been written before the contact of the Jews with the Arabs.

But Steinschneider's assumption can hardly be supported. Mishnat ha-Middot has nothing in common with the Baraita cited by the old scholars under that name: for the citations leave no doubt that the Baraita, even in its mathematical parts, was founded on the Bible; whereas the Mishnat ha-Middot is a purely secular work, and, possibly, it drew upon the same source as did Mohammed b. Musa, the oldest Arabic mathematician. The argument that the Mishnat ha-Middot has not been preserved in its entirety, and that in its original form there were references to the Bible for special points, is of no weight, since it is absolutely incomprehensible that aggadic or halakhic matter should fit into the frame of the work as it now is.

The same reason demolishes the hypothesis of the German translator of the Mishnat ha-Middot, who assumes that there was a Mishnah with the Gemara on it, and that citations of the old scholars refer to the Gemara, whereas the printed text represents the Mishnah (compare the tanna R. Nathan, and Baraita on the Erection of the Tabernacle).
