= Abba Saul =

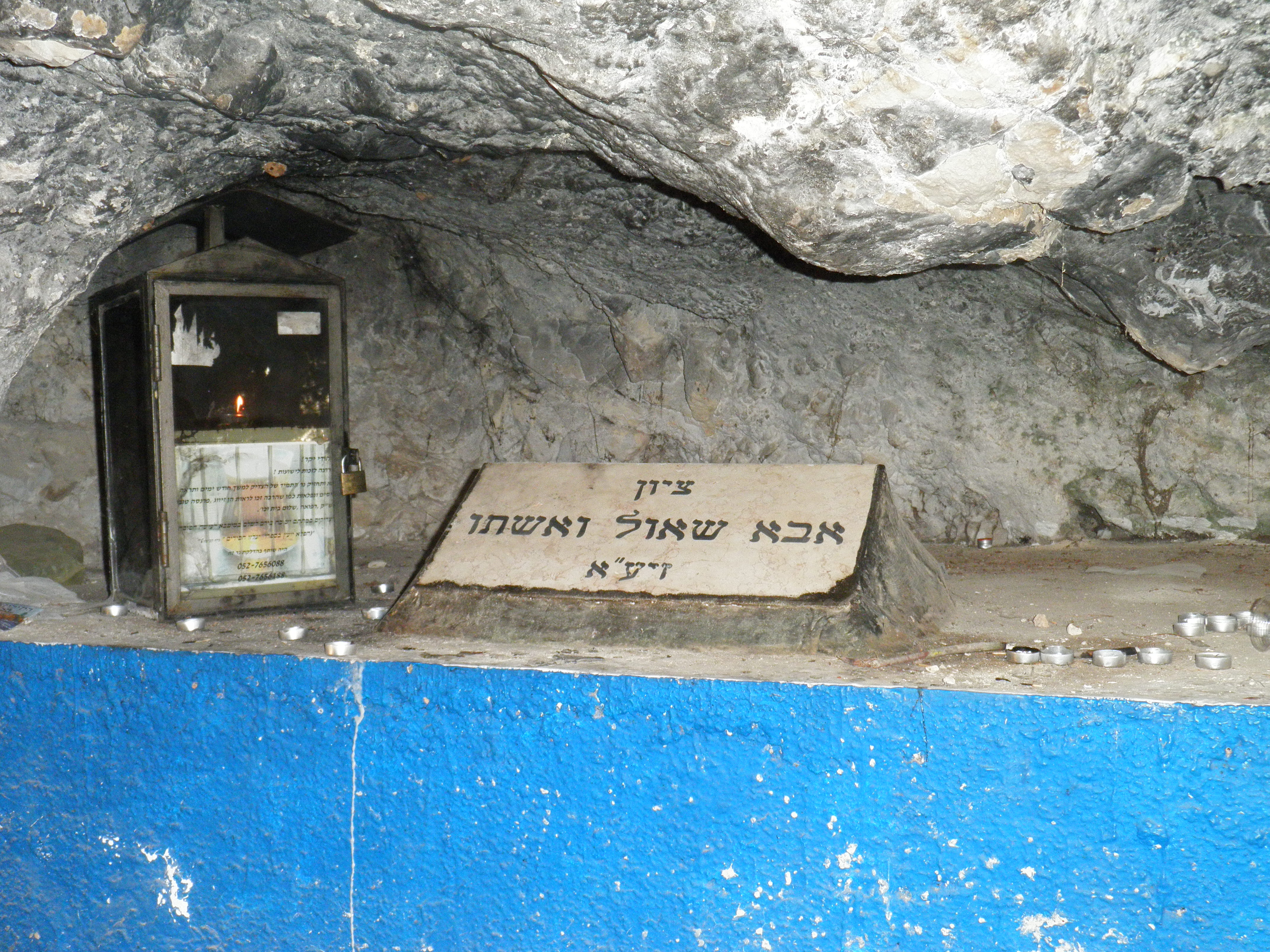
Tomb of Abba Saul and his wife

Abba Saul (Hebrew: אבא שאול, Abba Shaul) was a fourth generation Tanna (Jewish sage).

== Name ==
The "Abba" in "Abba Saul" is a title, and is not part of his name.

Sources that mention Abba Saul b. Nanos and Abba Saul bar Nash probably refer to the same individual.

== Biography ==
As Abba Saul explicitly refers to an opinion of R. Akiva's, and to disagreements between Akiva and Ben Azzai and between Akiva and the sages, it may be concluded that he was a pupil of R. Akiba and that he lived in the middle of the second century. In the story where Abba Saul prepared the bread in "Rabbi's" house, the reference must be to the house of the patriarch R. Simeon ben Gamaliel II not to that of R. Judah haNasi.

He does not appear to have held the title of rabbi. He was tall, and it is said that R. Tarfon reached only up to his shoulder.

He worked as a grave-digger.

== Teachings ==
Abba Saul devoted himself assiduously to the study of the mode of worship in the Temple. He also made a collection of mishnayot which in many respects differed from others; this collection has partly been preserved in the present Mishnah, whose redactor, Judah haNasi, occasionally made use of some passages in it which were at variance with other mishnaic compilations.

He demanded that a man perform yibbum solely for the sake of the mitzvah, and not for any other reason such as the sister-in-law's beauty.

He was a proponent of Judaism's version of imitatio dei. He explains the word anvehu as though it were composed of ani and vehu, and interprets it as meaning that man must endeavor to imitate God and, like Him, show charity and benevolence.

To Leviticus 19:2 ("Ye shall be holy: for I the Lord your God am holy") he cites the parallel, "The king's companions must do according to the king's will".

=== Quotes ===
- "Discord in the school causes general corruption"
- "Morality is greater than learning"
