= Rabbi Ilai I =

Rabbi Ilai (Hebrew: רבי אלעאי; sometimes referred to as Ilai the Elder; others: Rabbi Ilai I, or Alternative Hebrew spelling: רבי עילאי) was a third Generation, and 2nd-century Jewish Tanna sage, father of the well-known Tanna sage, Judah ben Ilai, and disciple of Eliezer ben Hurcanus and Gamaliel II.

Rabbi Ilai is cited once in the Mishnah, and six times in the Tosefta.

== Quotes ==
A man is known in three things: by his purse, by his drinking and by his anger.
