= Joshua ben Karha =

Jewish Tanna sage

Joshua Ben Karha (Hebrew: יהושע בן קרחה, Yehoshuaʿ ben Karḥa (or ben Korcha), was a tanna or Jewish sage from the era between 10–220.

== Biography ==
He was a colleague of Rabbi Meir and Simeon ben Gamaliel II, and a disciple of Rabbi Akiva.

Some believe that he was the son of Rabbi Akiva, who is referred to in the Talmud as Hebrew: הקר "the bald". However, others disagree, as in Tosafot Pesachim 112a. He never mentions Akiva in his teachings and would have done so had Akiva been his father.

Joshua rebuked Eleazar ben Simeon, who had delivered Jewish criminals over to the Romans: "You vinegar son of wine [= "degenerate scion of a noble father"], how long will you give the people of our God unto death?" in Bava Metzia 83b.

Joshua lived a long life, and blessed Judah ha-Nasi with a wish to live half as long as he had in Megilla 28b.

== Teachings ==
The Mishnah cites few of Ben Karha's halakhic commentaries in his name, and the few ones that are recorded are in conjunction with another tanna. Thus, the Babylonian Talmud cites Karha's practice on the authority of Eleazar ben Azariah: "Similarly, R' Yehoshua ben Karcha would declare pure due to [the authority of] R' Eleazar ben Azariah" in Tosefta, Tractate Negaim, 7:3. In the Jerusalem Talmud on the authority of Yochanan ben Nuri in Kil'ayim, 4:2 and his ruling along with Jose ben Halafta in the matter of the construction of Jericho in Sanhedrin, 14:2.

Compared to the few halachic commentaries, many aggadah commentaries are recorded in his name.
