= Solomon Gandz =

Austrian scientific historian

Solomon Gandz (2 February 1883 in Tarnobrzeg, Austria-Hungary – 30 March 1954) was a historian of science.

Gandz published on the history of mathematics and astronomy in medieval Jewish and Islamic civilizations.

From 1915 to 1919, Gandz was professor of Jewish theology and Jewish history in the gymnasium and realschule in Vienna.

From 1923 to 1934, he was librarian and professor of Arabic and Medieval Hebrew at the Rabbi Isaac Elchanan Theological Seminary of Yeshiva University in New York.

From 1942 until his death in March 1954, he was research professor of the history of Semitic Civilization at the Dropsie College for Hebrew and Cognate Learning in Philadelphia, Pennsylvania, (except for the war years when he was in government service).

Selections from his collected works were published by KTAV Publishing House NY in 1970. "Studies in Hebrew Astronomy and Mathematics" by Solomon Gandz. Selected with an introduction by Professor Shlomo Sternberg of Harvard. ISBN 978-0870680786

Among his major works is his annotated translation of Maimonides' Code "Sanctification of the New Moon" included in the Yale Judaica Series as well as his edition of Mishnat ha-Middot.

== Works ==
- Gandz, S.: "The invention of the decimal fractions and the application of the exponential calculus by Immanuel Bonfils of Tarascon (c. 1350)", Isis 25 (1936), 16–45.
- Solomon Gandz: "Studies in Hebrew Astronomy and Mathematics" Selected with an introduction by Professor Shlomo Sternberg of Harvard. KTAV Publishing House NY 1970. ISBN 978-0870680786

== See also ==
- Astronomy in medieval Islam
- Mathematics in medieval Islam
