= Issi ben Judah =

2nd and 3rd-century Middle Eastern rabbi

Issi ben Judah (Hebrew: איסי בן יהודה, "Issi ben Yehuda") was a Tanna of the late 2nd century and early 3rd century. He is often identified with R. Yosi Ish Hakfar HaBavli (Pirkei Avot 4:26), Yosef HaBavli, Issi Ha-babli, and Yosi/Yosef Ish Hutzal.

== Biography ==
He made Aliyah from Hutzal, Babylon, to the Land of Israel, and thus his name (Issi/Yosi/Yosef) is often followed by the title "Ha-Bavli" (the Babylonian) or "Ish Hutzal" (man of Hutzal). He was a disciple of Eleazar ben Shammua.

Issi ben Judah is often confounded with Issi ben Judah bar 'Hai.

The Talmud cites a baraita Issi had several other names:

With regard to Rabbi Yosei of Hutzal, it was taught: The Yosef of Hutzal mentioned in other places in the Gemara is the same person as Yosef the Babylonian. Yosef is the full name of Yosei. Furthermore, he is also known as Isi ben Gur Arye, he is Isi ben Yehuda, he is Isi ben Gamliel, and he is Isi ben Mahalalel. And what is his real name? His real name is Isi ben Akavya.

He was distinguished by the high esteem in which he held his colleagues, whose learning and ability he characterized in the most flattering terms.

== Teachings ==
=== Halacha ===
He ruled that the commandment to stand in the presence of the aged (Leviticus 19:32), which other rabbis believed applies only to an elderly Talmid Chacham, in fact applies to any aged person.

He valued the respect of parents so highly that (according to him) one must abandon fulfilling any mitzvah that can be fulfilled by another person, if that is necessary to carry out a father's order.

His opinions regarding culpability for sabbath transgressions and regarding anyone's right to eat from another's vineyard were recorded in the so-called Meggilat Setarim (Scroll of Hidden Things). However, in both cases his opinion is rejected by the Rabbis.

=== Aggadah ===
He declared that there are five passages in the Pentateuch, each of which contains a word that cannot be positively connected with either the preceding or the following words. This remark was afterward incorporated in the Masorah, where it is noted that "there are five passages in the Pentateuch that have an undecided word."
