= Hermann Schapira =

Lithuanian rabbi, mathematician, and zionist (1840–1898)

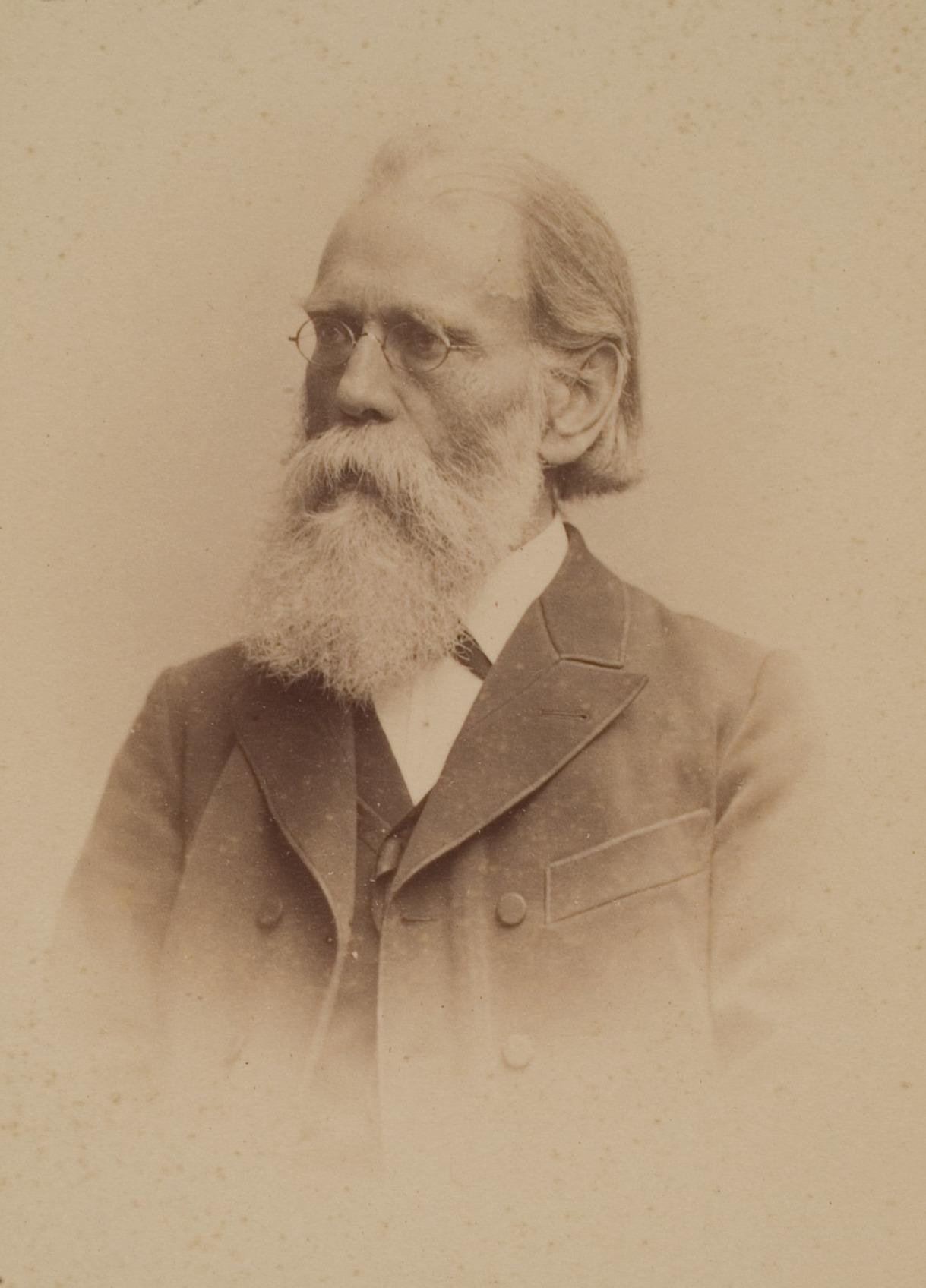
Zvi Hermann Schapira.

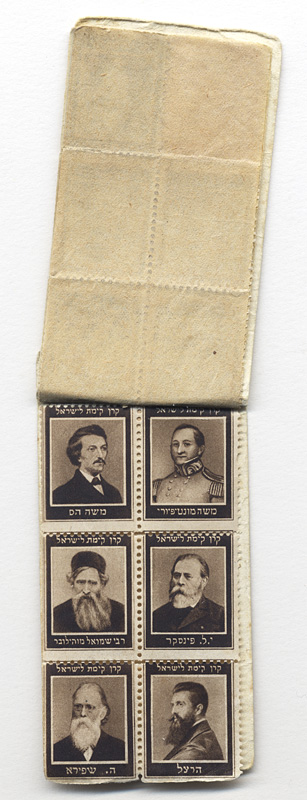
Stamps with inscribed portraits, including Hermann Schapira, ca. 1916. In the collection of the Jewish Museum of Switzerland.

Zvi Hermann Schapira (Hebrew: צבי הרמן שפירא; 1840–1898), or Hermann Hirsch Schapira, was a Lithuanian rabbi, mathematician at the University of Heidelberg, and Zionist. He was the first to suggest founding a Jewish National Fund for the purchase of land in Palestine.

== Biography ==
Zvi Hermann Schapira was born in a small Lithuanian town, Erswilken, not far from the larger town of Tauragė, part of the Russian Empire, but also close to the Prussian border. After studying for the rabbinate, Schapira was first appointed rabbi at age twenty-four, but then decided to dedicate his life to the secular sciences. He first moved to Odessa, and in 1868 to Berlin, where he enrolled for three years at the Gewerbeakademie. Schapira returned to Odessa, where he worked as a merchant for the next five years.

In 1878 he switched back to scientific studies, spending the next four years in the German university town of Heidelberg where he especially concentrated on mathematics and physics. In 1880, he applied for a PhD examination, with mathematics as a main subject and mechanics and Hebrew Language and Literature as secondary subjects. That same year, with Lazarus Fuchs as thesis advisor, he earned his doctorate with the dissertation Lineare homogene Cofunktionen, "Linear homogeneous cofunctions". In 1883 he established himself as Privatdozent in mathematics at the University of Heidelberg, becoming assistant professor in 1887. Schapira published his mathematical work in a number of specialised journals.

Throughout his life, Schapira remained a student of Hebrew literature, contributing an edition of the Mishnat ha-Middot (1880) based on a Munich manuscript. He also wrote for the Hebrew periodicals Ha-Meliẓ, Ha-Ẓefirah, and Mi-Mizraḥ umi-Ma'arab.

In the aftermath of the Russian pogroms of 1881, Schapira lent his support to the proto-Zionist Hibbat Zion movement. In 1884, Schapira proposed the establishment of an organization for the acquisition of land in Eretz Yisrael and came up with the idea of the "Blue Box" as means of collecting money. He presented proposal for the creation of a Jewish national fund at the First Zionist Congress of 1897, where he supported the Basel program, proving to be an enthusiastic Zionist from the very beginning of the movement. Although the Jewish National Fund (JNF) came into being only in 1901, at the Fifth Congress, after Shapira's death, he is still considered to be the "father" of the JNF.

Also at the 1897 congress, Shapira brought up the idea of founding a Hebrew university in Jerusalem.

During a Zionist lecture tour he contracted pneumonia in Cologne, and died there on 8 May 1898.
