= Rabbi Nehemiah =

2nd century AD Jewish scholar and rabbi

Rabbi Nehemiah was a rabbi who lived circa 150 AD (fourth generation of tannaim).

He was one of the great students of Rabbi Akiva, and one of the rabbis who received semicha from R' Judah ben Baba

The Talmud equated R' Nechemiah with Rabbi Nehorai: "His name was not Rabbi Nehorai, but Rabbi Meir."

His son, R' Yehudah BeRabi Nechemiah, studied before Rabbi Tarfon, but died at a young age after damaging R' Tarfon's honor, after R' Akiva predicted his death.

== Teachings ==
In the Talmud, all anonymous sayings in the Tosefta are attributed to R' Nechemiah. However, Sherira Gaon said that this does not mean they were said by R' Nechemiah, but that the laws in question were transmitted by R' Nechemiah.

In the Talmud, many times he disagrees with R' Judah bar Ilai on matters of halacha.

He is attributed as the author of the Mishnat ha-Middot (ca. AD 150), making it the earliest known Hebrew text on geometry, although some historians assign the text to a later period by an unknown author.

The Mishnat ha-Middot argues against the common belief that the Bible defines the geometric ratio π (pi) as being exactly equal to 3, based on the description in 1 Kings 7:23 (and 2 Chronicles 4:2) of the great bowl situated outside the Temple of Jerusalem as having a diameter of 10 cubits and a circumference of 30 cubits. He maintained that the diameter of the bowl was measured from the outside brim, while the circumference was measured along the inner brim, which with a brim that is one handbreadth wide (as described in the subsequent verses 1 Kings 7:24 and 2 Chronicles 4:3) yields a ratio from the circular rim closer to the actual value of π.

=== Quotes ===
- "Due to the sin of baseless hatred, great strife is found in a man's home, and his wife miscarries, and his sons and daughters die at a young age."

== See also ==
- History of numerical approximations of π
