= Nathan the Babylonian =

2nd-century Judean rabbi

Nathan the Babylonian (Hebrew: רבי נתן הבבלי, Rabbi Natan ha-Bavli), also known as Rabbi Nathan, was a tanna of the third generation (2nd century).

== Biography ==
=== Schism of R. Hananiah ===
Nathan was the son of a Babylonian exilarch. For reasons that are unclear he left Babylonia, and his bright prospects there, to settle in the land of Israel, where he was made chief of the school at Usha. Later he was entrusted by the patriarch Simeon ben Gamliel II to secure a reconciliation with R. Hananiah of Babylon, who had declared himself independent of the Sanhedrin of Judea and had established one in Babylon—a mission which Nathan, in company with R. Isaac, successfully executed. According to I. Halevy, however, both Nathan and Isaac were still residents of Babylon.

=== ab bet din ===
Soon afterward disagreement occurred between Nathan and Rabbi Meir, on the one side, and the president, R. Shimon ben Gamliel, on the other, owing to R' Shimon's attempt to abolish the equality previously existing among all members of the school, by restricting the tokens of esteem shown by the community to other members of the school lower in distinction than the president. Nathan and Meir conspired to depose Simon and to usurp his authority themselves, but the plot came to his knowledge, and he caused the conspirators to be expelled from the school. The two knew, however, how to make their absence felt. They sent in slips on which were written puzzling halakhic questions, so that a member of the school once exclaimed: "We are inside, and the learning is outside!" Both Nathan and Meir were ultimately readmitted on condition that the name of neither should thenceforth be mentioned in connection with his halakic decisions, but that a pseudonym should be used instead. In the case of Nathan this pseudonym was "some say"; in that of Meïr, "others say".

== Teachings ==
Nathan was a high Talmudic authority. Numerous halakhic decisions and aggadic sayings of his are recorded. To him is attributed the authorship of Avot de-Rabbi Natan, a kind of tosefta to the Pirkei Avot. He is said also to have been the author of the baraita Mem Tet Middot, no longer extant, on Haggadah and mathematics.

Nathan's chief opponent in halachic decisions was the patriarch R. Judah HaNasi, whom, however, he is said to have assisted in the collaboration of the Mishnah and who held him in high esteem.

== Quotes ==
- There is no love like the love of the Torah. Neither is there any wisdom like the wisdom of common sense. There is no beauty like the beauty of Jerusalem, and neither is there any wealth like the wealth of Madai.
- If there were a plant in your hand and they should say to you: "Look, the messiah is here!" Go and plant your plant and after that go forth to receive him.

== Bibliography ==
- Grätz, Gesch. ed. Leipzig, 1893, iv. 173, 185, 187;
- Heilprin, Seder ha-Dorot, ii. 290, Warsaw, 1882;
- I. Halevy, Dorot ha-Rishonim, ii. 97, 185, Frankfort-on-the-Main, 1901;
- Abot de-Rabbi Natan, ed. Schechter, Vienna, 1887;
