= Simeon ben Gamaliel II =

2nd century CE Judean rabbi and nasi and Great Sanhedrin president

Simeon (or Shimon) ben Gamaliel II (Hebrew: רבן שמעון בן גמליאל השני) was a Tanna of the third generation and president of the Great Sanhedrin. He was the son of Gamaliel II and father of Judah I (Yehuda HaNasi). Following the Bar Kokhba revolt, Simeon was appointed Nasi of the Sanhedrin, serving approximately from 140 to 170 CE.

== Biography ==
Simeon was a youth in Betar when the Bar Kokhba revolt broke out, but when that fortress was taken by the Romans he managed to escape the massacre. On the restoration of the Sanhedrin at Usha, Simeon was elected its president, this dignity being bestowed upon him not only because he was a descendant of the house of Hillel, but in recognition of his personal worth and influence.

There were many children in his family, one-half of whom were instructed in the Torah, and the other half in Greek philosophy. Simeon himself seems to have been trained in Greek philosophy; this probably accounting for his declaring later that the Scriptures might be written only in the original text and in Greek. Simeon appears to have studied natural science as well, for some of his sayings betray a scientific knowledge of the nature of plants and animals, while others concern the anatomy of the human body and the means of avoiding or of curing disease. It is not known who were his teachers in the Halakah; he transmits sayings of R. Judah bar Ilai, of R. Meir, and of R. Jose bar Ḥalafta. The last-named was honored as a teacher by Simeon, who addressed questions to him, and put many of his decisions into practice.

During Simeon's patriarchate the Jews were harried by daily persecutions and oppressions. In regard to these Simeon observes: "Our forefathers knew suffering only from a distance, but we have been surrounded by it for so many days, years, and cycles that we are more justified than they in becoming impatient". "Were we, as of yore, to inscribe upon a memorial scroll our sufferings and our occasional deliverances therefrom, we should not find room for all".

Jewish internal affairs were more firmly organized by Simeon ben Gamaliel, and the patriarchate attained under him a degree of honor previously unknown. While formerly only two persons, the nasi and the ab bet din, presided over the college, Simeon established the additional office of "ḥakam", with authority equal to that of the others, appointing Rabbi Meir to the new office. In order, however, to distinguish between the dignity of the patriarchal office and that attaching to the offices of the ab bet din and the ḥakam, Simeon issued an order to the effect that the honors formerly bestowed alike upon the nasi and the ab bet din were henceforth to be reserved for the patriarch (nasi), while minor honors were to be accorded the ab bet din and the ḥakam. By this ruling Simeon incurred the enmity of R. Meir, the ḥakam, and of R. Nathan, the ab bet din. Simeon had made this arrangement, not from personal motives, but in order to increase the authority of the college over which the nasi presided, and to promote due respect for learning. His personal humility is evidenced by his sayings to his son Judah I (Yehuda HaNasi), as well as by the latter's sayings.

His traditional burial location is in Kfar Manda in the Lower Galilee.

== Teachings ==
=== Halakha ===
Simeon's exceptional skills at rendering halakhic decisions, as also his ability to articulate the standard of Jewish norms and practices, were lauded by Rabbi Johanan, who said of him: “The halakha is in accordance with Rabban Simeon ben Gamaliel in all places where he cites [a teaching] in our Mishnah, except in three places: (a) in the matter of a guarantor (B. Bathra 173b), (b) in the matter of the cloak in Sidon (Gittin 74a), and (c) in the matter of bringing final proof (Sanhedrin 31a).”

In halakhic matters Simeon inclined toward lenient interpretation of the laws, and he avoided adding to the difficulties attending their observance. In many instances in which an act, in itself not forbidden by Biblical law, had later been prohibited merely out of fear that it might lead to transgressions, Simeon declared it permissible, saying that "fear should not be admitted as a factor in a decision". Of his halakhic opinions, about 30 relating to the Sabbath regulations and 15 referring to the seventh year have been preserved, in nearly all of which the liberality of views is evident. He always took into consideration the common usage, and he often maintained that the ultimate decision must follow common tradition. The habits of the individual must also be considered.

In his legal regulations regarding marriage, he made it an invariable rule to protect the rights and the dignity of the wife in preference to those of the husband. He endeavored to protect the slaves and secure to them certain rights. He held that the will of the community is more important than the interests and rights of the individual, and the latter must be sacrificed to the former. He especially strove to maintain the authority of the magistrates; according to his opinion the decisions of a court of law must be upheld, even though a slight error has been made; otherwise its dignity would suffer.

Simeon's decisions are mostly founded on sound common sense and an intimate acquaintance with the subjects treated, and, with three exceptions, his views, as set forth in the Mishnah, have been accepted as valid. He often cites the conditions of the past, which he learned probably from the traditions of his house, and which are highly important for the knowledge of older customs and habits. He speaks of the earlier festive celebrations in Jerusalem on the Fifteenth of Ab and on the Day of Atonement; of the customs followed there at meals when guests were present; of the work on the pools of Siloah; of the nature of the marriage contract and the bill of divorce.

=== Aggadah ===
Simeon praised the Samaritans for observing more strictly than did the Israelites such commandments of the Torah as they recognized. The Bible is in many places to be understood figuratively rather than literally.

=== Quotes ===
- "Great is peace, for Aaron the priest became famous only because he sought peace".
- "Justice must be accorded to non-Jews as to Jews; the former should have the option of seeking judgment before either a Jewish or a pagan court".
- Monuments (i.e. tombstones) are not erected for the righteous, for their words are their memorials.
- In three things do I praise the men of the East: That they do not exchange kisses with their mouths, but with their hands; that they do not bite into [a loaf of] bread, but will first cut it with a knife; and that they do not take counsel except in a broad place, for they do not consult the advice [of another] except in the field.

Preceded by Gamaliel II	Nasi ??? - ???	Succeeded by Judah I (c. 165–220)
