= Judah bar Ilai =

2nd century rabbi (tanna)

Judah beRabbi Ilai (Mishnaic Hebrew: יהודה בר' אלעאי), usually known as Rabbi Judah or Judah bar Ilai, (Note: The medieval Hebrew abbreviation for beRabbi ("son of Rabbi") was only distinguished from Aramaic bar ("son") by a single apostrophe, which is frequently forgotten by copyists and printers. Those named beRabbi are therefore often mistakenly called "bar".) was a rabbi of the 2nd century (fourth generation of Tannaim), and a disciple of Rabbi Akiva. Of the many Judahs in the Talmud, he is the one referred to simply as "Rabbi Judah" and is the most frequently mentioned sage in the Mishnah. He is not to be confused with Judah bar Ma'arava (יהודה בר מערבא, lit. 'Judah of the West'), an amora.

== Biography ==
Judah was born at Usha in the Galilee. His teachers were his father Rabbi Ilai I (himself a pupil of Eliezer ben Hurcanus), Rabbi Akiva, and Rabbi Tarfon. He studied under Tarfon in early youth, and was so closely associated with Tarfon that he even performed menial services for him.

He was ordained by Judah ben Bava at a time when the Roman Empire forbade ordination. Judah was forced to flee Hadrian's persecution.

Almost at the beginning of Hadrian's persecution, Judah was forced to flee from Usha and conceal himself, and he often related episodes of the "times of peril". When, after the revocation of Hadrian's edicts of persecution, the pupils of Akiba held their reunions and councils in Usha, Judah received the right to express his opinion before all others. He was then known as "Rosh ha-Medabbebrim" ("leader among the speakers") on the grounds that he was the best authority on Jewish traditions. He was intimately associated with the patriarch Simeon ben Gamaliel II, in whose house he is said to have been entrusted with the decision in matters pertaining to the religious law. He was also able to win the confidence of the Romans by his praise of their civilizing tendencies as shown in their construction of bridges, highways, and marketplaces.

Judah's personal piety was most rigid, and he observed many of the practises of the Hasideans and the Essenes. He drank no wine except on the days when Jewish law required, and recommended against eating expensive meats so as to avoid developing a taste for luxuries. On Friday, after he had bathed and clad himself in white to prepare for the Sabbath, he seemed to his pupils an angel. According to a later rule of interpretation, Judah is meant in all passages reading, "It once happened to a pious man".

Bar Ilai was naturally passionate and irascible, but such was his self-control that he seemed the reverse. He once showed exceptional mildness when he had an opportunity to reconcile a married couple. The study of Halakha was his chief and dearest occupation, and he lamented the fact that such a devotion was no longer widespread as in former times. Yet his interest in the joys and sorrows of his fellow men was keener still. Whenever a funeral or a wedding procession passed, he interrupted his study to join it.

Judah lived in poverty. His wife made a cloak that served them both in turn—his wife as she went to the market, and he on his way to the bet midrash. Nevertheless, he declined all assistance; he had accustomed himself to the simplest mode of life, and desired to have no delight in this world.

=== Tomb ===
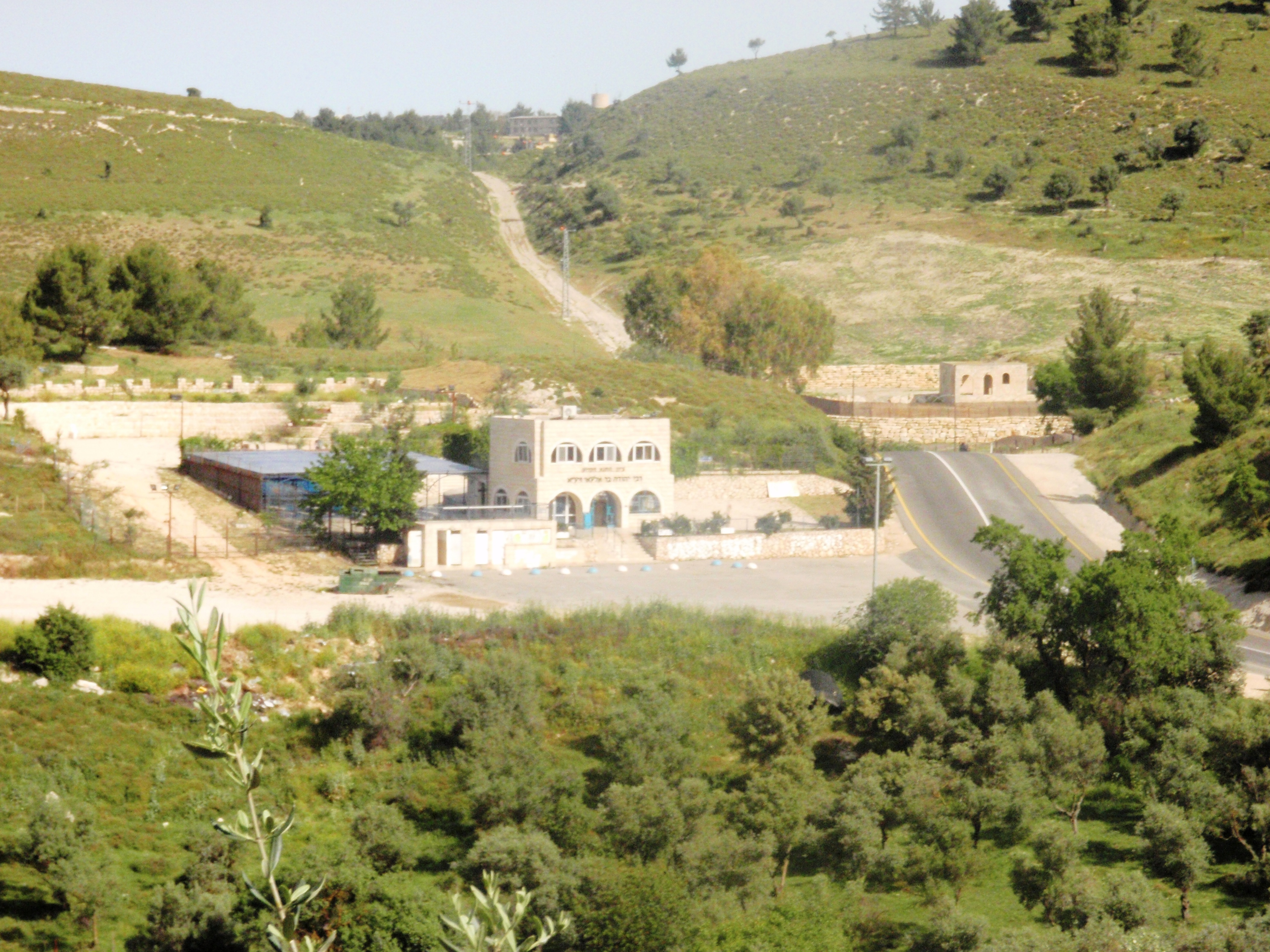
Tomb of Judah beRabbi Ilai, Ein Zeitim, Israel

Judah is believed to have lived to an old age; surviving his teachers and all of his colleagues. Among his disciples who paid him the last honors was Judah ha-Nasi. His grave was found at Ein Zeitim beside the tomb of his father.

Obadiah of Bertinoro, after visiting his tomb, wrote in 1495:

2,000 cubits from Safed is the grave of Rabbi Judah beRabbi Ilai, and there is a little village there called Ein Zeitoun. On the grave is a handsome tomb at which candles are lit . . .

Italian pilgrim Moses ben Mordecai Bassola wrote in 1523:

I was in Ein Zeitoun, which is a mil from Safed . . . and a bowshot from the village is the grave of Rabbi Judah beRabbi Ilai and Rabbi Yose his son. On this grave is an almond tree, fallow these last three years, and a great field of olive trees which are given over to this saint. They say that an Arab woman climbed the tree on the gave to gather almonds, disdaining to ask the saint's permission first as she had been instructed by others and mocking them instead. She fell from the tree and broke all her bones, so she gave up her golden bracelets and bought with them olive trees, and others followed suit, so that now he has four hundred olive trees. This incident occurred some sixty years past.

== Teaching ==
=== Halakha ===
Judah often teaches the Mishnah of Eliezer, which he had received from his father. He frequently explains the traditional halakhot by particularizations introduced by the phrases "Ematai?" (= "When does this statement apply?") and "Bameh debarim amurim?" (= "In what connection was this said?"). His most frequent teachings, however, are the doctrines of his master Akiba. His own halakhot he sets forth in the form of midrashim, for in his view, mishnah and midrash are identical. Those who devote themselves only to "mishnah" (that is, to the stereotyped halakhah without its Scriptural basis, he terms "enemies"; but those who direct their attention to the Scriptures are "brothers." Yet it is only they who interpret or expound the Bible who receive this latter name; for he who makes a literal translation of a verse of Scripture is a "liar," and he who adds to it a "blasphemer".

Judah's most famous teaching appears in the fourth chapter of Mesechet Berakhot. Rabbi Judah holds that the last times to pray the afternoon prayer is at Plag HaMincha.

In his Biblical interpretation and in the deduction of legal requirements from it, Judah adheres strictly to the method of his teacher Akiba, whose rules of exegesis he adopts. It is thus that he explains a word apparently superfluous, and employs the rules of "al tiḳri" and "noṭariḳon". Nevertheless, he interprets also according to the older Halakah in cases where he deduces a definition from the literal wording of a passage, and bases his explanation strictly on its obvious meaning, "debarim ki-ktavan". Most of the Sifra is to be attributed to Judah, nearly all the anonymous statements in it being his, "Setam Sifra R. Yehudah". Of his exegetical principles only one need be noted: "In the Holy Scriptures certain phrases which border on blasphemy have been altered".

=== Aggadah ===
Many aggadic utterances and traditions of Judah's have been preserved. His traditions regarding the Temple at Jerusalem are very numerous; and special interest attaches to his accounts of the origin of the Temple of Onias and of the Septuagint, as well as to his description of the synagogue at Alexandria and of the conditions and institutions of antiquity.

His high conception of the calling and the responsibility of a teacher of the Law, as well as his mild judgment of the multitude, was expressed in his interpretation of Isaiah 58:1: "Show my people their transgression"—that is, the teachers of the Law, from whose errors wickedness arises—"and the house of Jacob their sins"—that is, the ignorant, whose wickedness is only error.

Many of Judah's maxims and proverbs have likewise been preserved; they include:

- "Great is the giving of charity, as it brings near the [day of] redemption."
- "Great is labour, as it improves man's lot"
- "He that does not teach his son a trade, it is as though he had taught him brigandage"
- "The best path lies midway"
