= Masei =

43rd weekly Torah portion

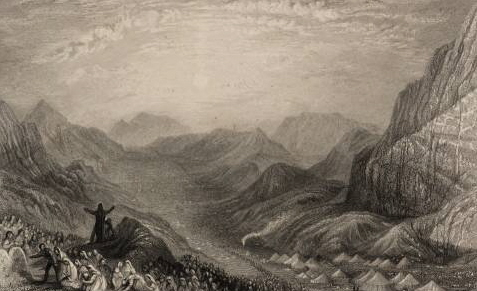
Encampment of Israelites, Mount Sinai (1836 intaglio print after J. M. W. Turner from Landscape illustrations of the Bible)

Masei, Mas'ei, or Masse (מַסְעֵי—Hebrew for "journeys," the second word, and the first distinctive word, in the parashah) is the 43rd weekly Torah portion (פָּרָשָׁה, parashah) in the annual Jewish cycle of Torah reading and the 10th and last in the Book of Numbers. The parashah comprises Numbers 33:1–36:13. The parashah discusses the stations of the Israelites' journeys, instructions for taking the land of Israel, cities for the Levites and refuge, and the daughters of Zelophehad.

It is made up of 5,773 Hebrew letters, 1,461 Hebrew words, 132 verses, and 189 lines in a Torah Scroll (סֵפֶר תּוֹרָה, Sefer Torah). Jews generally read it in July or August. The lunisolar Hebrew calendar contains up to 55 Saturdays, the exact number varying between 50 in common years and 54 or 55 in leap years. In some leap years (for example, 2014), parashat Masei is read separately. In most years (all coming years until 2035 in both the Diaspora and Israel), parashat Masei is combined with the previous parashah, Matot, to help achieve the number of weekly readings needed.

== Readings ==
In traditional Sabbath Torah reading, the parashah is divided into seven readings, or עליות, aliyot.

=== First reading: Numbers 33:1–10 ===
In the first reading, Moses recorded the various journeys of the Israelites from the land of Egypt as directed by God as follows: They journeyed from Rameses to Sukkoth to Etham to Pi-hahiroth to Marah to Elim to the Sea of Reeds.

=== Second reading: Numbers 33:11–49 ===
In the second reading, the Israelites journeyed from the Sea of Reeds to the wilderness of Sin to Dophkah to Alush to Rephidim to the wilderness of Sinai to Kibroth-hattaavah to Hazeroth to Rithmah to Rimmon-perez to Libnah to Rissah to Kehelath to Mount Shepher Haradah to Makheloth to Tahath to Terah to Mithkah to Hashmonah to Moseroth to Bene-jaakan to Hor-haggidgad to Jotbath to Abronah to Ezion-geber to Kadesh to Mount Hor. At God's command, Aaron ascended Mount Hor and died there, at the age of 123 years. They journeyed from Mount Hor to Zalmonah to Punon to Oboth to Iye-abarim to Dibon-gad to Almon-diblathaim to the hills of Abarim to the steppes of Moab.

=== Third reading: Numbers 33:50–34:15 ===
In the third reading, in the steppes of Moab, God told Moses to direct the Israelites that when they crossed the Jordan into Canaan, they were to dispossess all the inhabitants of the land, destroy all their figured objects, molten images, and cult places, and take possession of and settle in the land. They were to apportion the land among themselves by lot, clan by clan, with the share varying with the size of the group. But God warned that if the Israelites did not dispossess the inhabitants of the land, those whom they allowed to remain would become stings in their eyes and thorns in their sides, and would harass the Israelites in the land, so that God would do to the Israelites what God had planned to do to the inhabitants of the land. God then told Moses to instruct the Israelites in the boundaries of the land, which included the Dead Sea, the wilderness of Zin, the Wadi of Egypt, the Mediterranean Sea, Mount Hor, the eastern slopes of the Sea of Galilee, and the River Jordan. Moses informed the Israelites that the tribe of Reuben, the tribe of Gad, and the half-tribe of Manasseh had received their portions across the Jordan.

=== Fourth reading: Numbers 34:16–29 ===
In the fourth reading, God told Moses the names of the men through whom the Israelites were to apportioned the land: Eleazar, Joshua, and a chieftain named from each tribe.

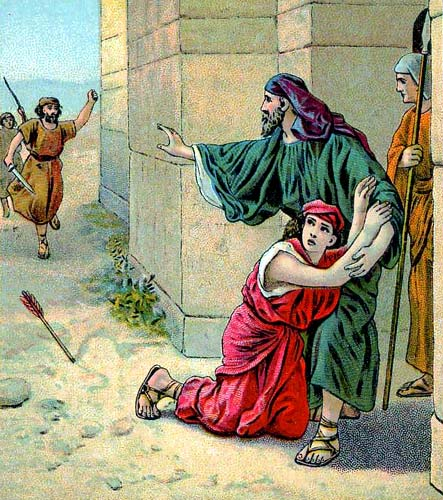
Cities of Refuge (illustration from a Bible card published 1901 by the Providence Lithograph Company)

=== Fifth reading: Numbers 35:1–8 ===
In the fifth reading, God told Moses to instruct the Israelites to assign the Levites out of the other tribes' holdings towns and pasture land for 2,000 cubits outside the town wall in each direction. The Israelites were to assign the Levites 48 towns in all, of which 6 were to be Cities of Refuge to which a manslayer could flee. The Israelites were to take more towns from the larger tribes and fewer from the smaller.

=== Sixth reading: Numbers 35:9–34 ===
In the sixth reading, three of the six Cities of Refuge were to be designated east of the Jordan, and the other three were to be designated in the land of Canaan. The Cities of Refuge were to serve as places to which a slayer who had killed a person unintentionally could flee from the avenger, so that the slayer might not die without a trial before the assembly. Anyone, however, who struck and killed another with an iron object, stone tool, or wood tool was to be considered a murderer, and was to be put to death. The blood-avenger was to put the murderer to death upon encounter. Similarly, if the killer pushed or struck the victim by hand in hate or hurled something at the victim on purpose and death resulted, the assailant was to be put to death as a murderer. But if the slayer pushed the victim without malice aforethought, hurled an object at the victim unintentionally, or inadvertently dropped on the victim any deadly object of stone, and death resulted—without the victim being an enemy of the slayer and without the slayer seeking the victim harm—then the assembly was to decide between the slayer and the blood-avenger. The assembly was to protect the slayer from the blood-avenger, and the assembly was to restore the slayer to the city of refuge to which the slayer fled, and there the slayer was to remain until the death of the high priest. But if the slayer ever left the city of refuge, and the blood-avenger came upon the slayer outside the city limits, then there would be no bloodguilt if the blood-avenger killed the slayer. The slayer was to remain inside the city of refuge until the death of the high priest, after which the slayer could return to his land. A slayer could be executed only on the evidence of more than one witness. The Israelites were not to accept a ransom for the life of a murderer guilty of a capital crime; the murderer was to be put to death. Similarly, the Israelites were not to accept ransom in lieu of flight to a city of refuge, enabling a slayer to return to live on the slayer's land before the death of the high priest. Bloodshed polluted the land, and only the blood of the one who shed it could make expiation for the bloodshed.

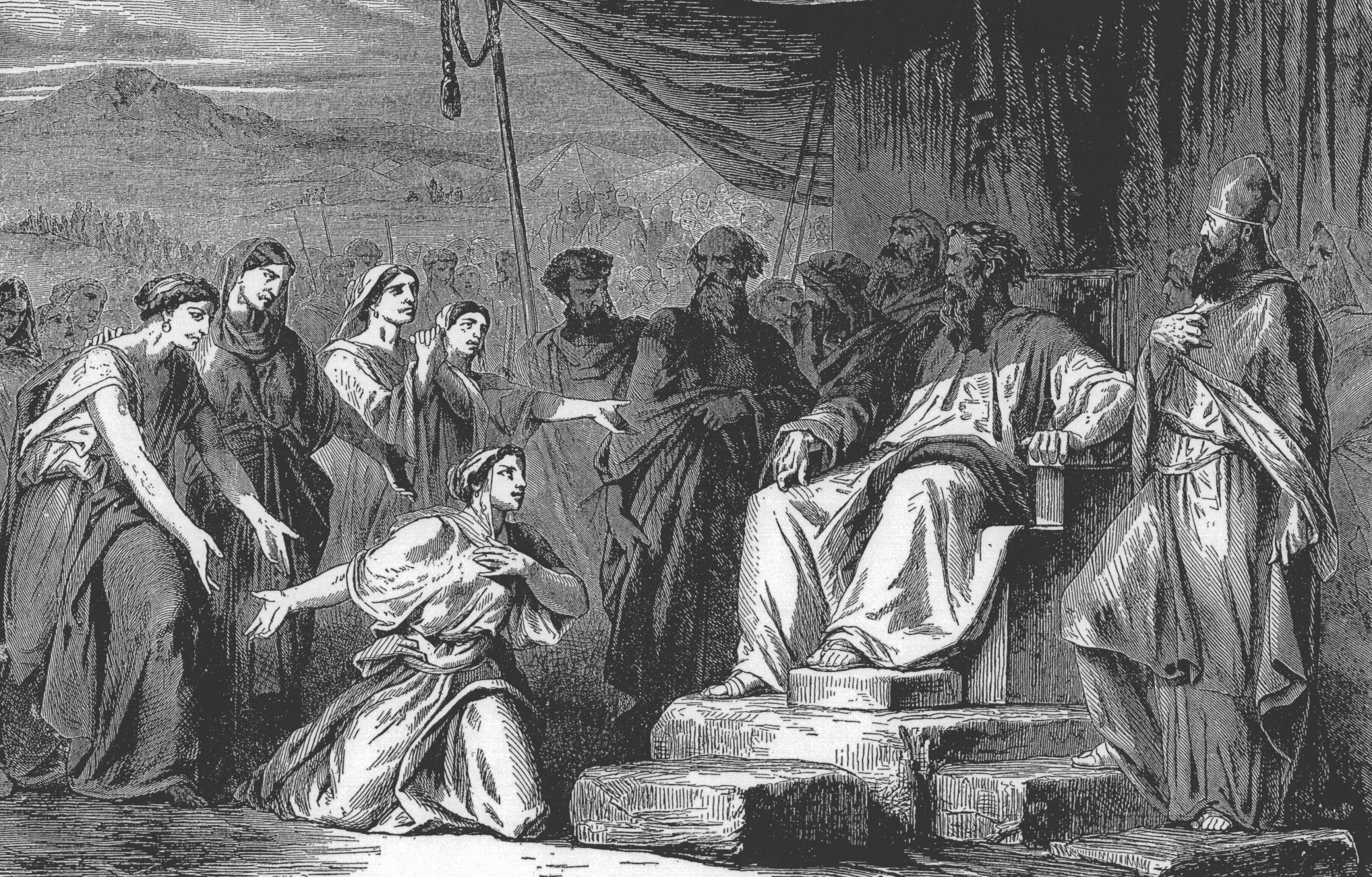
The Daughters of Zelophehad (illustration from the 1908 Bible and Its Story Taught by One Thousand Picture Lessons)

=== Seventh reading: Numbers 36:1–13 ===
In the seventh reading, kinsmen of Zelophehad, a man of the tribe of Manasseh who had died without a son, appealed to Moses and the chieftains regarding Zelophehad's daughters, to whom God had commanded Moses to assign land. Zelophehad's kinsmen expressed the concern that if Zelophehad's daughters married men from another Israelite tribe, their land would be cut off from Manasseh's ancestral portion and be added to the portion of the husbands' tribe. At God's bidding, Moses instructed the Israelites that the daughters of Zelophehad could marry only men from their father's tribe, so that no inheritance would pass from one tribe to another. And Moses announced the general rule that every daughter who inherited a share was required to marry someone from her father's tribe, in order to preserve each tribe's ancestral share. The daughters of Zelophehad did as God had commanded Moses, and they married cousins, men of the tribe of Manasseh.

=== Readings according to the triennial cycle ===
Jews who read the Torah according to the triennial cycle of Torah reading read the parashah according to a different schedule.

== In inner-biblical interpretation ==
The parashah has parallels or is discussed in these Biblical sources:

=== Biblical sources on Numbers chapter 35 ===
The Hebrew Bible refers to cities of refuge in Exodus 21:13; Numbers 35:9–34; Deuteronomy 4:41–43 and 19:1–13; and Joshua 20:1–9.

The Torah addresses the need for corroborating witnesses three times. Numbers 35:30 instructs that a manslayer may be executed only on the evidence of two or more witnesses. Deuteronomy 17:6 states the same multiple witness requirement for all capital cases. And Deuteronomy 19:15 applies the rule to all criminal offenses.

=== Biblical sources on Numbers chapter 36 ===
The story of the daughters of Zelophehad in Numbers 36 is a sequel of that in Numbers 27. And then Joshua 17:3–6 reports the awarding of lands to the daughters of Zelophehad.

== In early nonrabbinic interpretation ==
The parashah has parallels or is discussed in these early nonrabbinic sources:

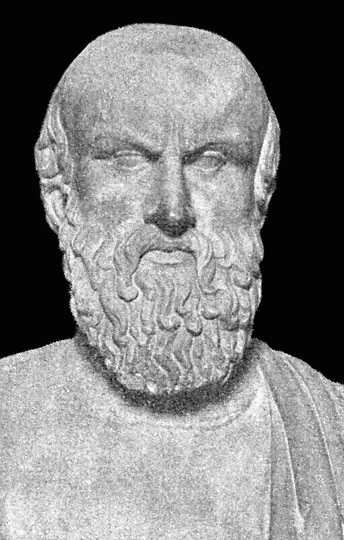
Aeschylus

=== Early interpretations of Numbers chapter 35 ===
With the Cities of Refuge in Numbers 35:6-34, Divine intervention replaces a system of vengeance with a system of justice, much as in the play of the 5th century BCE Greek playwright Aeschylus The Eumenides, the third part of The Oresteia, the goddess Athena’s intervention helps to replace vengeance with trial by jury.

Philo called the rule of Numbers 35:30 that a judge should not receive the testimony of a single witness "an excellent commandment." Philo argued first that a person might inadvertently gain a false impression of a thing or be careless about observing and therefore be deceived. Secondly, Philo argued it unjust to trust to one witness against many persons, or indeed against only one individual, for why should the judge trust a single witness testifying against another, rather than the defendant pleading on the defendant's own behalf? Where there is no preponderance of opinion for guilt, Philo argued, it is best to suspend judgment.

Similarly, Josephus reported the rule of Numbers 35:30, writing that judges should not credit a single witness, but rather should rely only on three, or two at the least, and only those whose testimony was confirmed by their good lives.

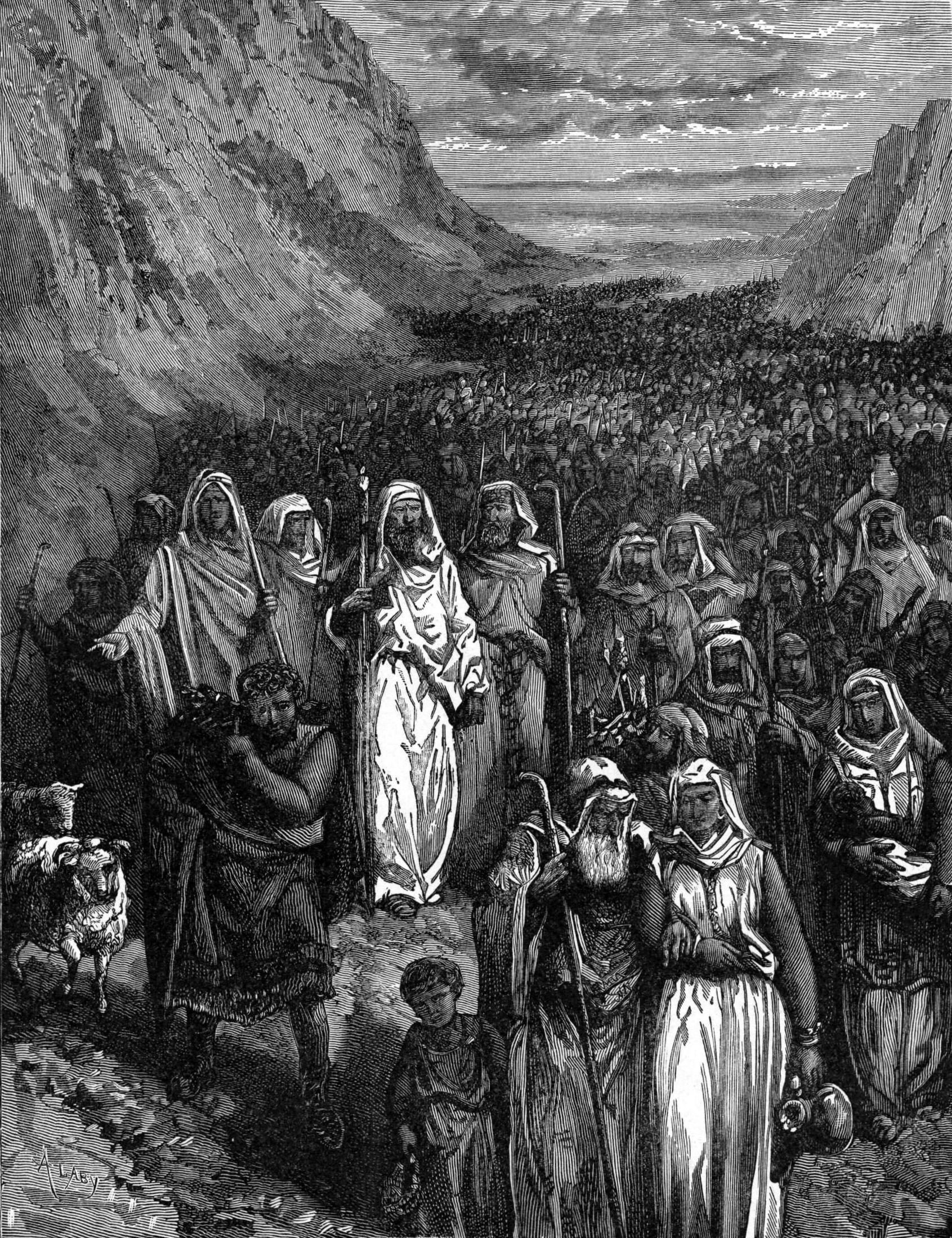
The March of the Israelites Through the Wilderness (illustration from the 1897 Bible Pictures and What They Teach Us by Charles Foster)

== In classical rabbinic interpretation ==
The parashah is discussed in these rabbinic sources from the era of the Mishnah and the Talmud:

=== Classical rabbinic interpretations of Numbers chapter 33 ===
A Midrash taught that God told the Israelites that during all the 40 years that they spent in the wilderness, God did not make it necessary for them to flee. Rather, God cast their enemies down before them. As Deuteronomy 8:15 reports, there were numerous snakes, fiery serpents, and scorpions in the wilderness, but God did not allow them to harm the Israelites. Thus, God told Moses to write down in Numbers 33 the stages by which Israel journeyed in the wilderness, so that they would know the miracles that God had performed for them.

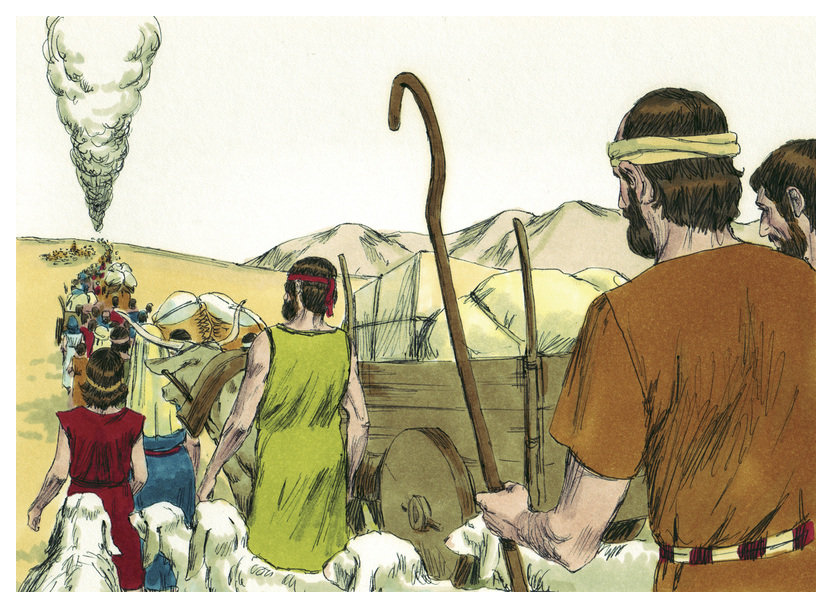
The Israelites journeyed in the wilderness. (1984 illustration by Jim Padgett, courtesy of Sweet Publishing)

Noting that both Numbers 33:1 and Psalm 77:21 report that the Israelites travelled "under the hand of Moses and Aaron," a Midrash taught that the similarity served to confirm that God led the Israelites in the wilderness (in the words of Psalm 77:21) "like a flock."

A Midrash compared the listing of the Israelites' journeys in Numbers 33 to a king who had a sick son whom he took to a distant place to get cured. On the way back, the king retraced all their previous journeys, noted where his son caught cold and where his son's head ached.

A Midrash used the report of Numbers 33:4 to explain why the Israelites had to leave Egypt to conduct their sacrifices. The Midrash interpreted the words of Exodus 8:22, "Lo, if we sacrifice the abomination of the Egyptians before their eyes, will they not stone us?" to teach that the Egyptians saw the lamb as a god. Thus, when God told Moses to slay the paschal lamb (as reflected in Exodus 12:21), Moses asked God how he could possibly do so, when the lamb was as Egyptian god. God replied that the Israelites would not depart from Egypt until they slaughtered the Egyptian gods before the Egyptians' eyes, so that God might teach them that their gods were really nothing at all. And thus God did so, for on the same night that God slew the Egyptian firstborn, the Israelites slaughtered their paschal lambs and ate them. When the Egyptians saw their firstborn slain and their gods slaughtered, they could do nothing, as Numbers 33:4 reports, "While the Egyptians were burying them whom the Lord had smitten among them, even all their firstborn; upon their gods also the Lord executed judgment."

Reading Numbers 33:4, "Upon their gods also the Lord executed judgments," the Pirke De-Rabbi Eliezer taught that when the Israelites left Egypt, God cast down and broke all the Egyptians' idols.

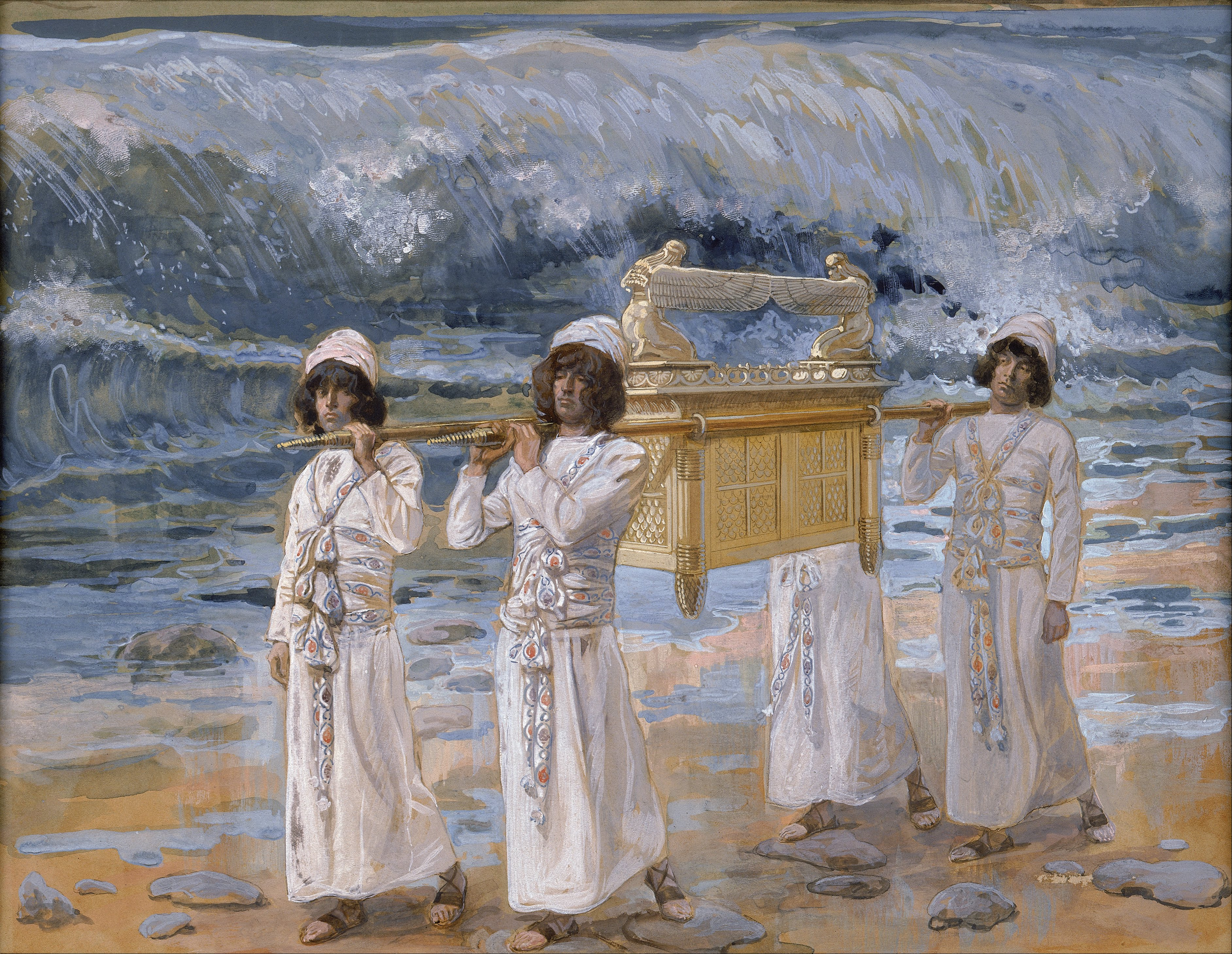
The Ark Passes Over the Jordan (watercolor circa 1896–1902 by James Tissot)

The Gemara taught that while the Israelites were in the Jordan River with the water standing up in a heap (as reported in Joshua 3:14–17), Joshua told them that they were crossing the Jordan on condition that they would disinherit the inhabitants of the land, as Numbers 33:53 says: "Then you shall drive out all the inhabitants of the land from before you." Joshua told them that if they did this, it would be well and good; otherwise, the water would return and drown them.

Interpreting Numbers 26:53, 26:55, and 33:54, the Gemara noted a dispute over whether the land of Israel was apportioned according to those who came out of Egypt or according to those who went into the land of Israel. It was taught in a Baraita that Rabbi Josiah said that the land of Israel was apportioned according to those who came out of Egypt, as Numbers 26:55 says, "according to the names of the tribes of their fathers they shall inherit." The Gemara asked what then to make of Numbers 26:53, which says, "Unto these the land shall be divided for an inheritance." The Gemara proposed that "unto these" meant adults, to the exclusion of minors. But Rabbi Jonathan taught that the land was apportioned according to those who entered the land, for Numbers 26:53 says, "Unto these the land shall be divided for an inheritance." The Gemara posited that according to this view, Numbers 26:55 taught that the manner of inheritance of the land of Israel differed from all other modes of inheritance in the world. For in all other modes of inheritance in the world, the living inherit from the dead, but in this case, the dead inherited from the living. Rabbi Simeon ben Eleazar taught a third view—that the land was divided both according to those who left Egypt and also according to those who entered the land of Israel, so as to carry out both verses. The Gemara explained that according to this view, one among those who came out of Egypt received a share among those who came out of Egypt, and one who entered the land of Israel received a share among those who entered the land. And one who belonged to both categories received a share among both categories.

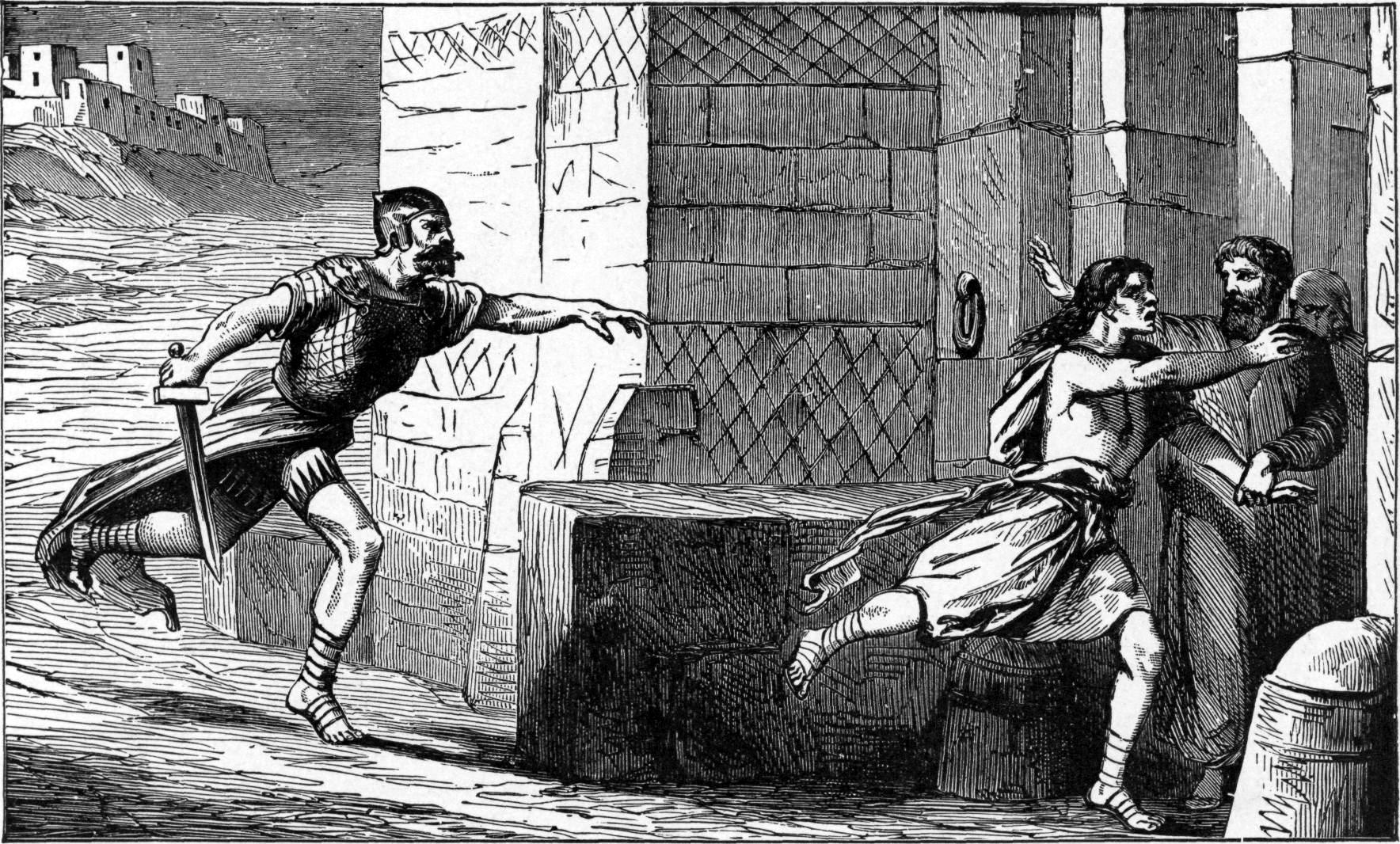
The City of Refuge (illustration from Charles Foster, Bible Pictures and What They Teach Us (1897))

=== Classical rabbinic interpretations of Numbers chapter 35 ===
Chapter 2 of tractate Makkot in the Mishnah, Tosefta, Jerusalem Talmud, and Babylonian Talmud interpreted the laws of the Cities of Refuge in Exodus 21:12–14, Numbers 35:1–34, Deuteronomy 4:41–43, and 19:1–13.

The Mishnah taught that those who killed in error went into banishment. One would go into banishment if, for example, while one was pushing a roller on a roof, the roller slipped over, fell, and killed someone. One would go into banishment if while one was lowering a cask, it fell and killed someone. One would go into banishment if while coming down a ladder, one fell and killed someone. But one would not go into banishment if while pulling up the roller it fell back and killed someone, or while raising a bucket the rope snapped and the falling bucket killed someone, or while going up a ladder one fell and killed someone. The Mishnah's general principle was that whenever the death occurred during a downward movement, the culpable person went into banishment, but if the death did not occur during a downward movement, the person did not go into banishment. If while chopping wood, the iron slipped from the ax handle and killed someone, Rabbi taught that the person did not go into banishment, but the sages said that the person did go into banishment. If from the split log rebounding killed someone, Rabbi said that the person went into banishment, but the sages said that the person did not go into banishment.

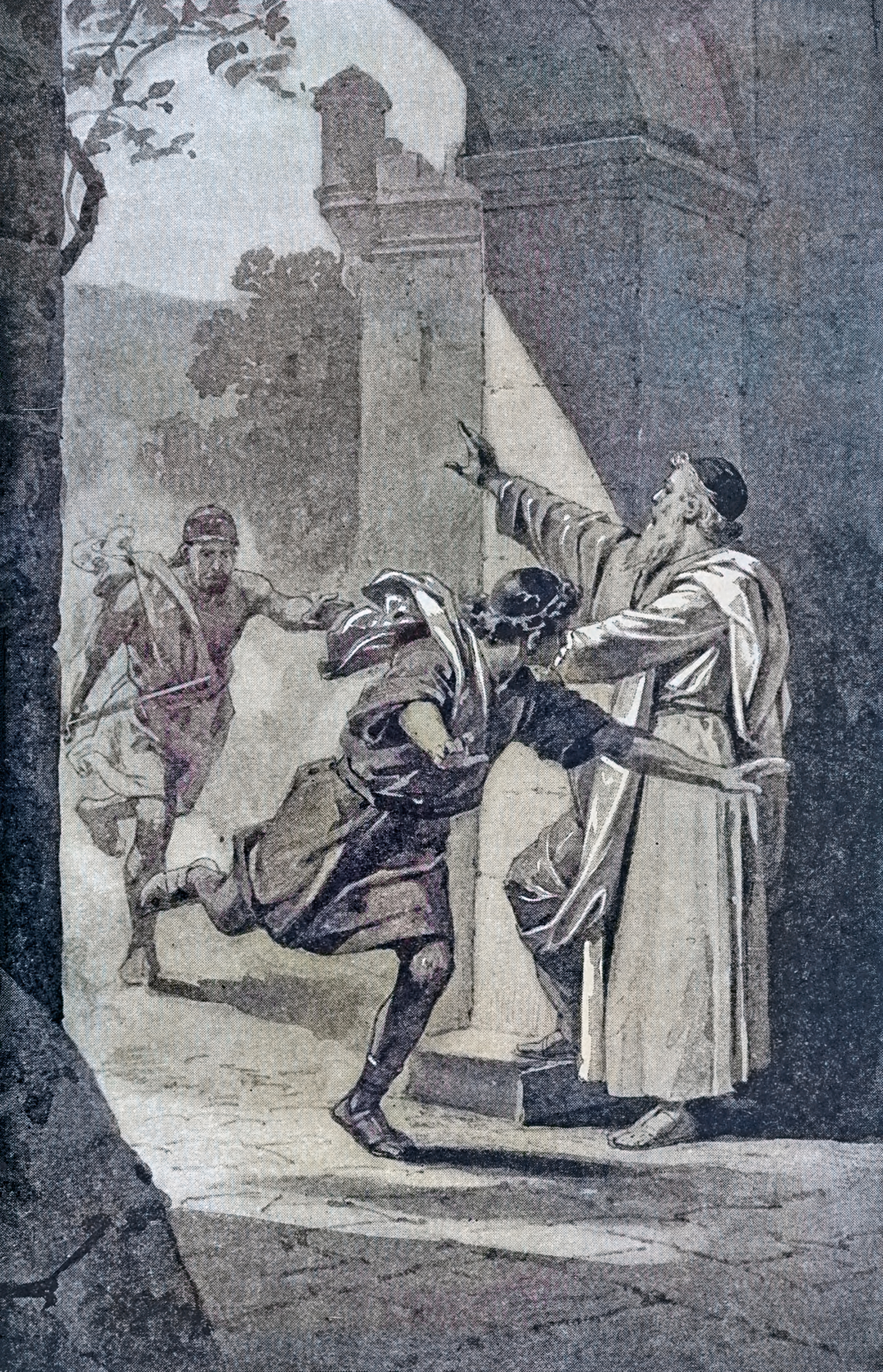
Fleeing to the City of Refuge (illustration from Charles Foster, The Story of the Bible (Philadelphia: A.J. Homan Co., 1884), page 173)

Rabbi Jose bar Judah taught that to begin with, they sent a slayer to a city of refuge, whether the slayer killed intentionally or not. Then the court sent and brought the slayer back from the city of refuge. The Court executed whomever the court found guilty of a capital crime, and the court acquitted whomever the court found not guilty of a capital crime. The court restored to the city of refuge whomever the court found liable to banishment, as Numbers 35:25 ordained, "And the congregation shall restore him to the city of refuge from where he had fled." Numbers 35:25 also says, "The manslayer ... shall dwell therein until the death of the high priest, who was anointed with the holy oil," but the Mishnah taught that the death of a high priest who had been anointed with the holy anointing oil, the death of a high priest who had been consecrated by the many vestments, or the death of a high priest who had retired from his office each equally made possible the return of the slayer. Rabbi Judah said that the death of a priest who had been anointed for war also permitted the return of the slayer. Because of these laws, mothers of high priests would provide food and clothing for the slayers in Cities of Refuge so that the slayers might not pray for the high priest's death. If the high priest died at the conclusion of the slayer's trial, the slayer did not go into banishment. If, however, the high priests died before the trial was concluded and another high priest was appointed in his stead and then the trial concluded, the slayer returned home after the new high priest's death.

A Baraita taught that a disciple in the name of Rabbi Ishmael noted that the words "in all your dwellings" (בְּכֹל מֹשְׁבֹתֵיכֶם, b'chol moshvoteichem) appear both in the phrase, "You shall kindle no fire throughout your habitations upon the Sabbath day," in Exodus 35:3 and in the phrase, "these things shall be for a statute of judgment unto you throughout your generations in all your dwellings," in Numbers 35:29. The Baraita reasoned from this similar usage that just as the law prohibits kindling fire at home, so the law also prohibits kindling fire in the furtherance of criminal justice. And thus, since some executions require kindling a fire, the Baraita taught that the law prohibits executions on the Sabbath.

The Gemara read Numbers 35:24–25, “And the congregation shall judge . . . and the congregation shall save,” to requires a court to search for grounds to exonerate the defendant.

The Jerusalem Talmud read the reference to “congregation” in Numbers 35:24–25 to support the proposition that ten comprise a congregation. Rabbi Abba and Rabbi Yasa said in the name of Rabbi Joḥanan that Scripture uses the word “congregation” in Numbers 35:24–25, “The congregation shall judge, and the congregation shall rescue,” and also in Numbers 14:27, “How long shall this wicked congregation murmur against me?” and argued that just as the word “congregation” in Numbers 14:27 refers to ten persons (the twelve spies minus Joshua and Caleb), the word “congregation” in Numbers 35:24–25, must refer to ten persons, and thus judgments needed to take place in the presence of ten.

The Gemara read Numbers 35:30 to limit the participation of witnesses and Rabbinical students in trials. The Mishnah taught that in monetary cases, all may argue for or against the defendant, but in capital cases, all may argue in favor of the defendant, but not against the defendant. The Gemara asked whether the reference to "all" in this Mishnah included even the witnesses. Rabbi Jose son of Rabbi Judah and the Rabbis disagreed to some degree. The Gemara read the words of Numbers 35:30, "But one witness shall not testify against any person," to indicate that a witness cannot participate in a trial—either for acquittal or condemnation—beyond providing testimony. Rabbi Jose son of Rabbi Judah taught that a witness could argue for acquittal, but not for condemnation. Rav Papa taught that the word "all" means to include not the witnesses, but the Rabbinical students who attended trials, and thus was not inconsistent with the views of Rabbi Jose son of Rabbi Judah or of the Rabbis. The Gemara explained the reasoning of Rabbi Jose son of Rabbi Judah for his view that witnesses may argue in favor of the accused as follows: Numbers 35:30 says, "But one witness shall not testify against any person that he die." Hence, according to the reasoning of Rabbi Jose son of Rabbi Judah, only "so that he die" could the witness not argue, but the witness could argue for acquittal. And Resh Lakish explained the reasoning of the Rabbis forbidding a witness to argue in favor of the accused as follows: The Rabbis reasoned that if a witness could argue the case, then the witness might seem personally concerned in his testimony (for a witness contradicted by subsequent witnesses could be subject to execution for testifying falsely). The Gemara then asked how the Rabbis interpreted the words, "so that he die" (which seems to indicate that the witness may not argue only when it leads to death). The Gemara explained that the Rabbis read those words to apply to the Rabbinical students (constraining the students not to argue for condemnation). A Baraita taught that they did not listen to a witnesses who asked to make a statement in the defendant's favor, because Numbers 35:30 says, "But one witness shall not testify." And they did not listen to a Rabbinical student who asked to argue a point to the defendant's disadvantage, because Numbers 35:30 says, "One shall not testify against any person that he die" (but a student could do so for acquittal).

The Gemara cited the Torah's requirement for corroborating witnesses to support the Mishnah's prohibition of circumstantial evidence in capital cases. The Mishnah reported that they admonished witnesses in capital cases not to testify based on conjecture (that is, circumstantial evidence) or hearsay, for the court would scrutinize the witnesses' evidence by cross-examination and inquiry. The Gemara reported that the Rabbis taught that the words "based on conjecture" in the Mishnah meant that the judge told the witness that if the witness saw the defendant running after the victim into a ruin, and the witness pursued the defendant and found the defendant with bloody sword in hand and the victim writhing in agony, then the judge would tell the witness that the witness saw nothing (and did not actually witness a murder). It was taught in a Baraita that Rabbi Simeon ben Shetach said that he once did see a man pursuing his fellow into a ruin, and when Rabbi Simeon ben Shetach ran after the man and saw him, bloody sword in hand and the murdered man writhing, Rabbi Simeon ben Shetach exclaimed to the man, "Wicked man, who slew this man? It is either you or I! But what can I do, since your blood (that is, life) does not rest in my hands, for it is written in the Torah (in Deuteronomy 17:6) 'At the mouth of two witnesses ... shall he who is to die be put to death'? May He who knows one's thoughts (that is, God) exact vengeance from him who slew his fellow!" The Gemara reported that before they moved from the place, a serpent bit the murderer and he died.

In the Mishnah, Rabbi Jose said that a malefactor was never put to death unless two witnesses had duly pre-admonished the malefactor, as Deuteronomy 17:6 prescribes, "At the mouth of two witnesses or three witnesses shall he that is worthy of death be put to death." And the Mishnah reported another interpretation of the words, "At the mouth of two witnesses," was that the Sanhedrin would not hear evidence from the mouth of an interpreter.

Rav Zutra bar Tobiah reported that Rav reasoned that Deuteronomy 17:6 disqualified isolated testimony when it prescribes that "at the mouth of one witness he shall not be put to death." This special admonition against one witness would seem redundant to the earlier context, "At the mouth of two witnesses or three witnesses shall he that is worthy of death be put to death," so it was taken to mean that individual witnesses who witnesses the crime, one by one, in isolation from each other, were insufficient to convict. Similarly, a Baraita taught that Deuteronomy 17:6 prescribes, "At the mouth of one witness he shall not be put to death," to cover instances where two persons see the wrongdoer, one from one window and the other from another window, without seeing each other, in which case the evidence could not be joined to form a set of witnesses sufficient to convict. Even if they both witnessed the offence from the same window, one after the other, their testimony could not be joined to form a set of witnesses sufficient to convict.

Rabbi Ishmael the son of Rabbi Jose commanded Rabbi Judah the Prince not to engage in a lawsuit against three parties, for one would be an opponent and the other two would be witnesses for the other side.

Discussing the need for two witnesses, the Gemara related an incident where Tuveya sinned with immorality, and Zigud testified about it before Rav Pappa. Rav Pappa instructed that Zigud be lashed. When Zigud complained to Rav Pappa that Tuveya sinned and Zigud was lashed, Rav Pappa replied that Deuteronomy 19:15 enjoins, "One witness shall not rise up against a person," and Zigud testified against Tuveya alone, thereby merely giving Tuveya a bad reputation. Rabbi Samuel bar Rav Isaac said that Rav said that although one who sees another committing a sin should not testify alone against the sinner, the witness is nonetheless permitted to hate the sinner, as Exodus 23:5 states, "If you see the donkey of one who hates you lying under its load," and the Gemara interpreted this verse to refer to a case like this one where a witness saw a sinner perform a licentious matter. Rav Aḥa, son of Rava, asked Rav Ashi whether one who saw someone sin may tell one's teacher, so that the teacher too would hate the sinner. Rav Ashi replied that if the student knew that teacher trusted the student as much as two witnesses, and therefore the teacher would accept the student's statement, then the student should tell the teacher, but if the teacher did not trust the student as much as two witnesses, then the student should not tell the teacher.

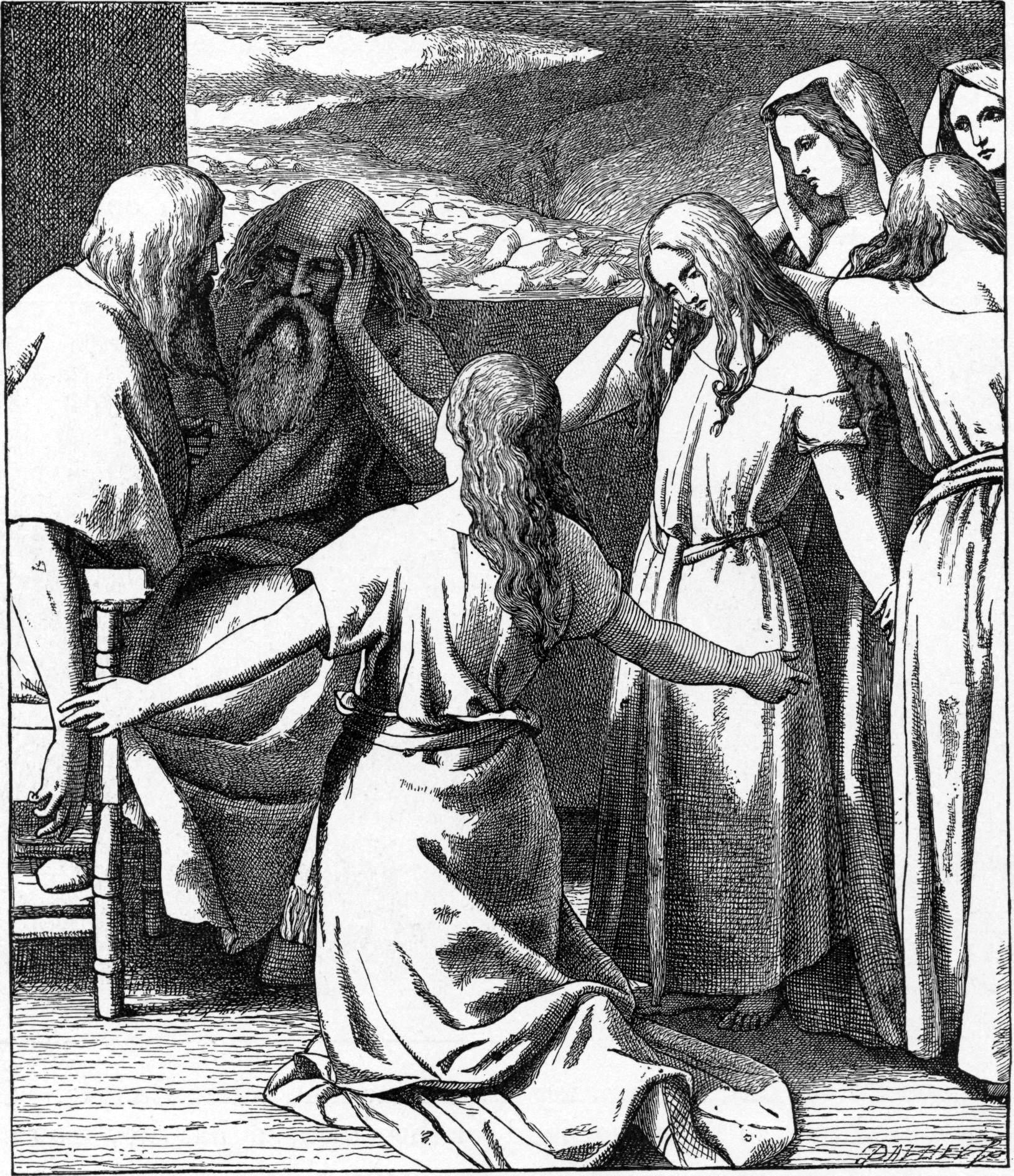
The Daughters of Zelophehad (illustration from the 1897 Bible Pictures and What They Teach Us by Charles Foster)

Rabbi Ishmael taught that the avoidance of danger to one’s own life takes precedence over the prohibition of shedding blood in Numbers 35:34. Rabbi Ishmael cited Exodus 22:1, in which the right to defend one’s home at night takes precedence over the prohibition of killing, to support the proposition that the avoidance of danger to human life takes precedence over the laws of the Sabbath. For in Exodus 22:1, in spite of all the other considerations, it is lawful to kill the thief. So even if in the case of the thief—where doubt exists whether the thief came to take money or life, and even though Numbers 35:34 teaches that the shedding of blood pollutes the land, so that the Divine Presence departs from Israel—yet it was lawful to save oneself at the cost of the thief’s life, how much more may one suspend the laws of the Sabbath to save human life.

=== Classical rabbinic interpretations of Numbers chapter 36 ===
Chapter 8 of tractate Bava Batra in the Mishnah and Babylonian Talmud and chapter 7 of tractate Bava Batra in the Tosefta interpreted the laws of inheritance in Numbers 27:1–11 and 36:1–9.

Rava interpreted the words "This is the thing" in Numbers 36:6 to teach that the law prohibiting intermarriage between the tribes held only for the generation of Zelophehad's daughters.

A Baraita taught that Zelophehad's daughters were wise, Torah students, and righteous. And a Baraita taught that Zelophehad's daughters were equal in merit, and that is why the order of their names varies between Numbers 27:1 and 36:11. According to the Gemara, Zelophehad's daughters demonstrated their righteousness in Numbers 36:10–11 by marrying men who were fitting for them.

== In medieval Jewish interpretation ==
The parashah is discussed in these medieval Jewish sources:

=== Medieval interpretations of Numbers chapter 35 ===
In the Torah’s teaching (in Exodus 21:12–14, Numbers 35:10–29, and Deuteronomy 4:41–42 and 19:1–13) that one who killed another unintentionally did not incur capital punishment, Baḥya ibn Paquda found proof that an essential condition of liability for punishment is the association of mind and body in a forbidden act—that liability requires both intention and action.

== In modern interpretation ==
The parashah is discussed in these modern sources:

=== Modern interpretations of Numbers chapter 33 ===
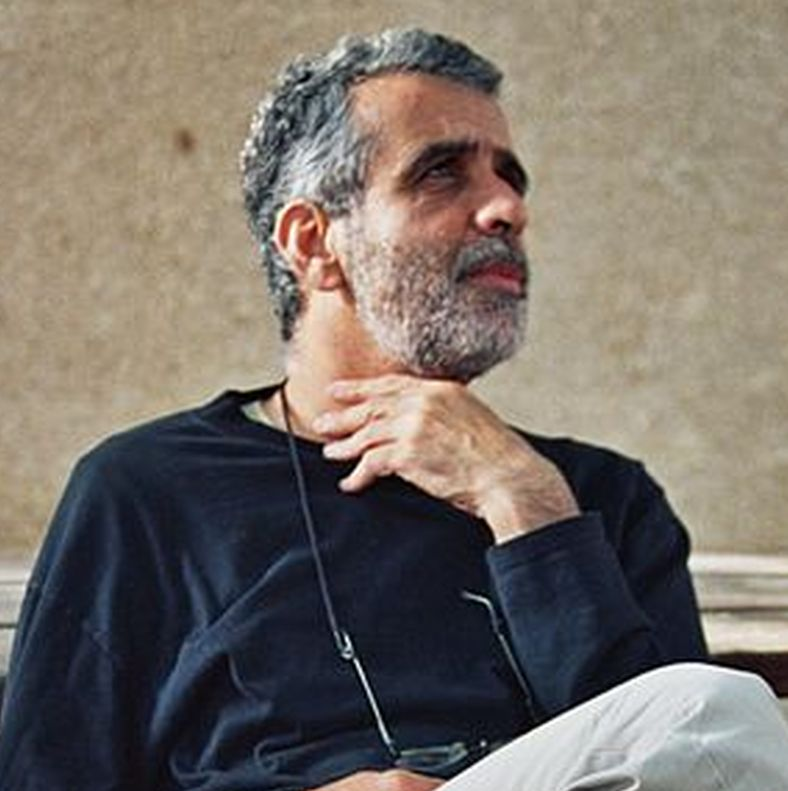
Finkelstein

Archeologists Israel Finkelstein of Tel Aviv University and Neil Asher Silberman argued that the place Sukkot mentioned in Exodus 12:37 and Numbers 33:5 is probably the Hebrew form of the Egyptian Tjkw, a name referring to a place or an area in the eastern Nile Delta that appears in Egyptian texts from the time of the Nineteenth Dynasty of Egypt, the dynasty of Ramesses II. Finkelstein and Silberman reported that a late thirteenth century BCE Egyptian papyrus recorded that the commanders of the forts along the delta's eastern border closely monitored the movements of foreigners there, saying: "We have completed the entry of the tribes of the Edomite Shasu (that is, Bedouin) through the fortress of Merneptah-Content-with-Truth, which is in Tjkw, to the pools of Pr-Itm which (are) in Tjkw for the sustenance of their flocks." And Finkelstein and Silberman reported that the abundant Egyptian sources describing the time of the New Kingdom of Egypt in general and the thirteenth century in particular make no reference to the Israelites. Finkelstein and Silberman also noted that according to the Biblical narrative, the Israelites camped at Kadesh-barnea for 38 of the 40 years of their wanderings. Numbers 34 makes clear Kadesh's general location from its description of the southern border of the land of Israel, and archaeologists have identified it with the large and well-watered oasis of Ein el-Qudeirat in eastern Sinai, on the border between modern Israel and Egypt. The name Kadesh was probably preserved over the centuries in the name of a nearby smaller spring called Ein Qadis. A small mound with the remains of a Late Iron Age fort stands at the center of this oasis. Yet repeated excavations and surveys throughout the area have not provided even the slightest evidence for activity in the Late Bronze Age, not even a single sherd left by a tiny fleeing band of frightened refugees. Finkelstein and Silberman concluded that based on the evidence at the specific sites where Numbers 33 says that the Israelites camped for extended periods during their wandering in the desert (and where some archaeological indication—if present—would almost certainly be found), a mass Exodus did not happen at the time and in the manner described in the Bible.

=== Modern interpretations of Numbers chapter 35 ===
Gordon Wenham read Numbers 35:1–8 as part of a kind of social contract between the Israelite population and the Levites. In Numbers 3:12, God took the Levites in place of all the firstborn Israelite boys, so every Israelite family had a stake in the Levites, as the Levites served God in place of the eldest boy in the family. In exchange for the Levites doing their dangerous work on behalf of the Israelites, Numbers 18:21–24 called on the Israelites to give the Levites a tithe of their produce and Numbers 35:1–8 assigned the Levites 48 cities.

Tamara Cohn Eskenazi wrote that Biblical laws required Israelites to act as redeemers for relatives in four situations: (1) redemption of land in Leviticus 25:25–34, (2) redemption of persons from slavery, especially in Leviticus 25:47–50, (3) redemption of objects dedicated to the sanctuary in Leviticus 27:9–28, and (4) avenging the blood of a murdered relative in Numbers 35.

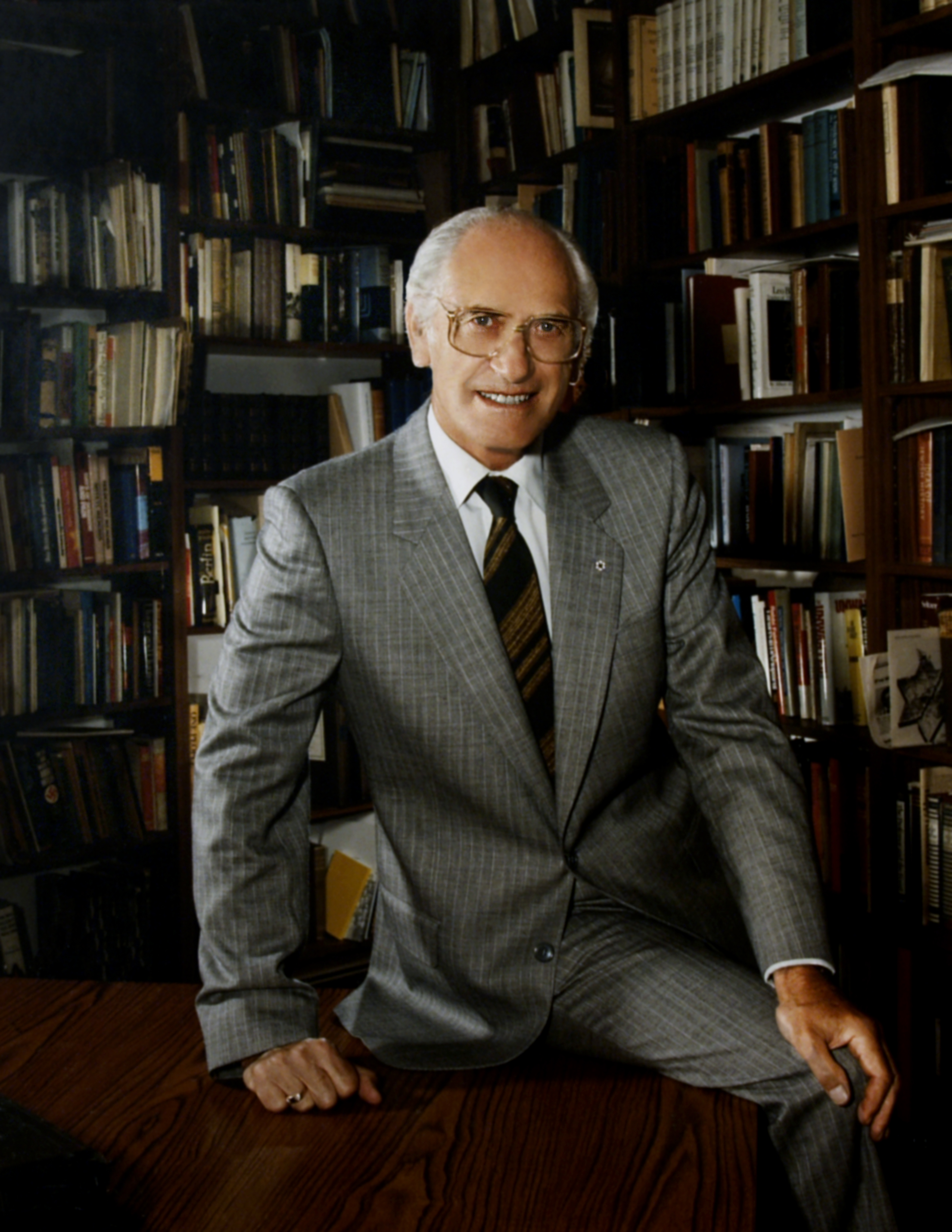
Plaut

Gunther Plaut argued that the discussions of Cities of Refuge in Numbers 35:9–34 and Deuteronomy 4:41–43 and 19:1–13 were composed during a later, settled period, in order to accommodate the disappearance of local altars that previously served as places of refuge. Noting that Numbers 35:25 provided that the person who had committed manslaughter would remain in the city of refuge until the death of the high priest, Plaut argued that only death could compensate for the loss of the victim's life, and thus the death of the High Priest became the symbol of communal expiation.

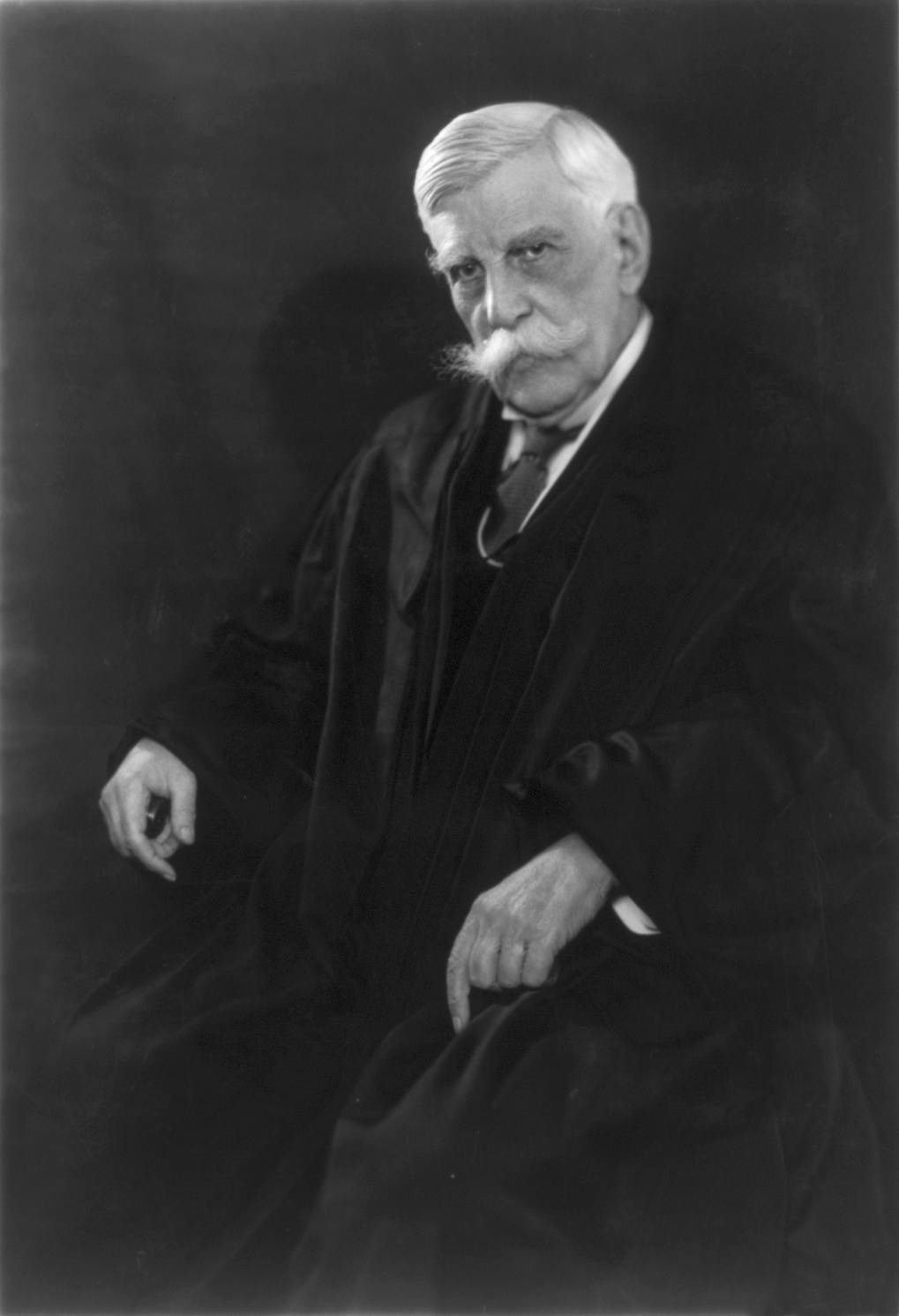
Holmes

Explaining the origins of the law that one can see in the Cities of Refuge, Justice Oliver Wendell Holmes Jr. wrote that early forms of legal procedure were grounded in vengeance. Roman law and German law started from the blood feud, which led to the composition, at first optional, then compulsory, by which the feud was bought off. Holmes reported that in Anglo-Saxon practice, the feud was pretty well broken up by the time of William the Conqueror. The killings and house-burnings of an earlier day became the appeals of mayhem and arson, and then the legal actions now familiar to lawyers.

H. Clay Trumbull argued that the "redeemer" ( גֹּאֵל, goel) in Numbers 35:12 was responsible for securing for the victim's family an equivalent of their loss of blood—the loss of life—by other blood, or by an agreed-upon payment for its value. Trumbull taught that the redeemer's mission was "not vengeance, but equity. He was not an avenger, but a redeemer, a restorer, a balancer."

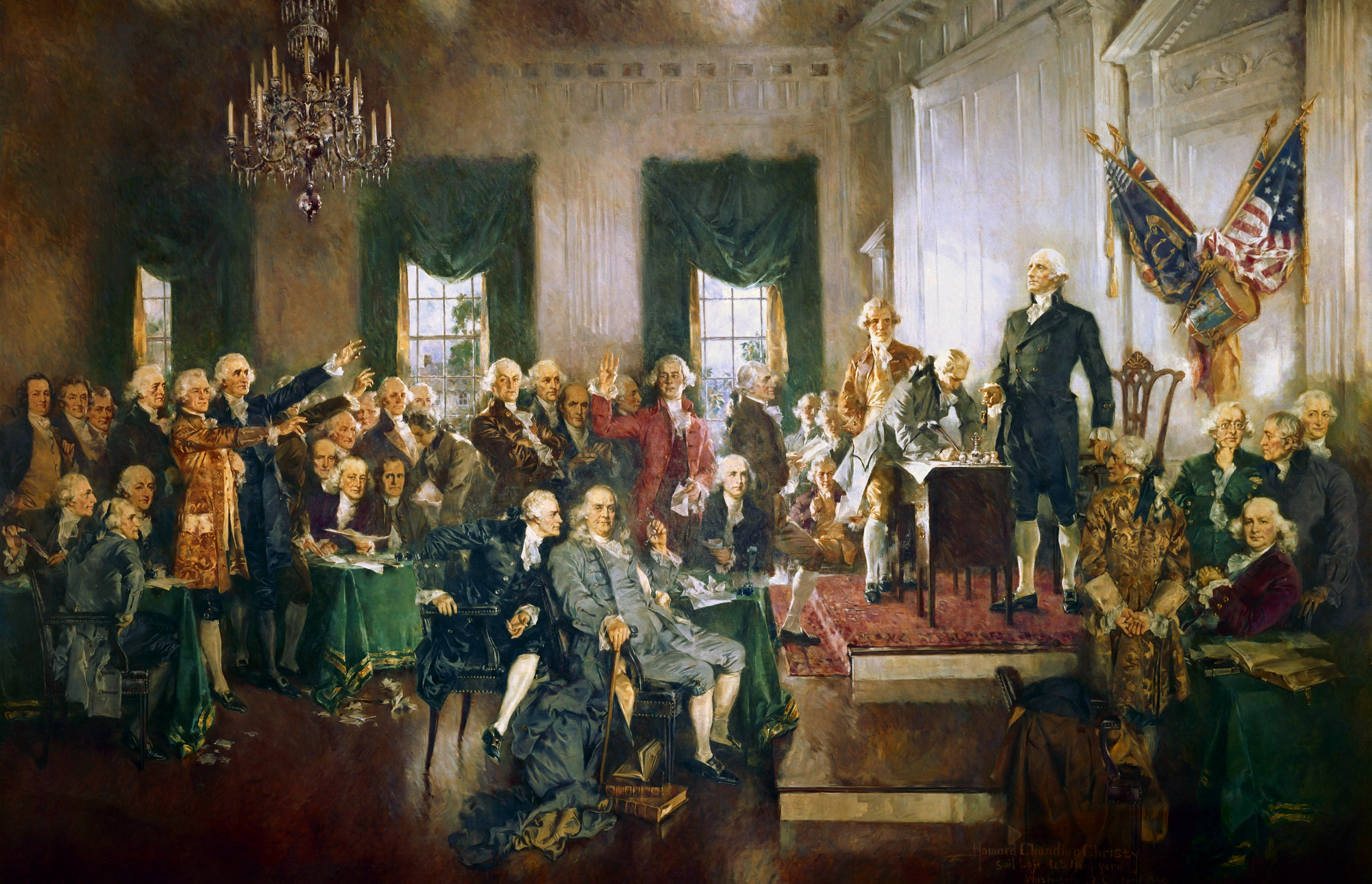
Scene at the Signing of the Constitution of the United States (1940 painting by Howard Chandler Christy)

In an echo of the requirement in Numbers 35:30 that the Israelites could execute a manslayer only with the evidence of two or more witnesses, Article III, Section 3 of the United States Constitution provides that the government may convict a person of treason only with the testimony of two witnesses to the same overt act or a confession in open court. A then-recent precursor of the Constitution's provision appeared in 1776 in the Laws of Virginia, which provided that defendants be "convicted of open deed by the evidence of two sufficient and lawful witnesses, or their own voluntary confession." At the Constitutional Convention, the requirement for two witnesses first appeared in the first draft of the Constitution presented on August 6, 1787. During debate on August 20, 1787, John Dickinson of Delaware questioned what was meant by the "testimony of two witnesses" and whether they were to be witnesses to the same overt act or to different overt acts. The Convention consequently voted to insert the words "to the same overt act" after "two witnesses." Benjamin Franklin supported the amendment, arguing that prosecutions for treason were virulent and perjury too easily made use of against innocent defendants. In The Federalist Papers, Alexander Hamilton cited the requirement for two witnesses to establish treason as one of several provisions in the Constitution that enumerate rights that, taken together, amounted to a bill of rights.

== Commandments ==
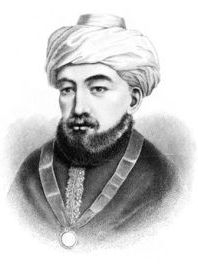
Moses Maimonides

According to Maimonides and Sefer ha-Chinuch, there are two positive and four negative commandments in the parashah:

- To give the Levites cities to inhabit and their surrounding fields
- Not to kill the murderer before he stands trial
- The court must send the accidental murderer to a city of refuge
- That a witness in a trial for a capital crime should not speak in judgment
- Not to accept monetary restitution to atone for the murderer
- Not to accept monetary restitution instead of being sent to a city of refuge

== Haftarah ==
The haftarah for the parashah is:

- for Ashkenazi Jews: Jeremiah 2:4–28 and 3:4.
- for Sephardi Jews: Jeremiah 2:4–28 and 4:1–2.

When parashah Masei is combined with parashah Matot (as it will be until 2035), the haftarah is the haftarah for parashah Masei.

When the parashah coincides with Shabbat Rosh Chodesh (as it did in 2008), Isaiah 66:1 and 66:23 are added to the haftarah.
