= Sifra =

Halakhic midrash to the Book of Leviticus

Sifra (Jewish Babylonian Aramaic: סִפְרָא, romanized: sip̄rā, lit. 'document') is the Midrash halakha to the Book of Leviticus. It is frequently quoted in the Talmud and the study of it followed that of the Mishnah. (Note: As appears from Tanḥuma, quoted in Or Zarua, i. 7b) Like Leviticus itself, the midrash is occasionally called Torat Kohanim, and in two passages Sifra debbe Rav.

== Authorship ==
Maimonides, in the introduction to his Yad ha-Ḥazaḳah, and others have declared that the title Sifra debbe Rav indicates Abba Arikha is the author. I.H. Weiss attempts to support this. His proofs are not conclusive, though neither are the opposing arguments of Friedmann, who tries to show that the expression Sifra debbe Rav does not refer to the midrash under discussion.

Malbim wrote in the introduction to his Sifra edition that Hiyya bar Abba was the redactor of the Sifra. There are no less than 39 passages in Jerusalem Talmud and the midrashim in which expositions found also in the Sifra are quoted in the name of Ḥiyya, and the fact that no tannaim after Judah ha-Nasi are mentioned in the Sifra supports the view that the book was composed during the time of that scholar. If Ḥiyya was its author, the title Sifra debbe Rav is to be explained as indicating that Sifra was among the midrashim accepted by his school and which came into general use.

== Sources ==
Traces of R. Judah bar Ilai's influence are less evident. The fact that the views expressed in some "setamot" agree with R. Judah's views has little significance. Such seṭamot may be opposed by others that contradict R. Judah's views.

All this, however, is no reason for attacking the above-mentioned assumption that the Sifra in its principal parts is a midrash of R. Judah's. Hoffmann remarks not incorrectly that Sifra Nedabah 4:12 agrees with the views of R. Eliezer, whose decision R. Judah frequently accepts as handed down by his own father, R. Ila'i, a pupil of R. Eliezer. Similarly, Sifra, Emor, 17:4 et seq. agrees with R. Eliezer's view. Aside from R. Judah's midrash, R. Ḥiyya may have used also R. Simeon's midrash, although some of the passages mentioned there seem to prove little. More doubtful is the relation to R. Ishmael's midrash; and in this connection must be considered the question whether the citation of certain explanations of Leviticus introduced by the formula תנא דבי ר"י and actually found in Sifra is not in part due to confusion.

But to R. Ishmael's school undoubtedly belong the later additions to "'Arayot," which (according to Ḥag. 1:1 and Yer. 1b) were not publicly taught in R. Akiva's school; i.e., Aḥare, 13:3-15; Ḳedoshim, 9:1-7, 11:14, and finally, of course, the so-called Baraita de-Rabbi Yishma'el (beginning). The so-called "Mekilta de-Millu'im" or "Aggadat Millu'im" to Leviticus 8:1-10 is similarly to be distinguished from the remainder of the Sifra. It exists in two recensions, of which the second, covering mishnayot 14-16 and 29-end, is cited by Rashi as "Baraita ha-Nosefet 'al Torat Kohanim she-Lanu." The tannaim quoted most frequently in Sifra are R. Akiva and his pupils, also R. Eliezer, R. Ishmael, R. Jose ha-Gelili, Rebbi, and less often R. Jose bar Judah, R. Eleazar bar R. Simeon, and R. Simeon b. Eleazar.

== The Present Text ==
The Sifra was divided, according to an old arrangement, into 9 "dibburim" and 80 "parashiyyot" or smaller sections. As it exists today it is divided into 14 larger sections and again into smaller peraḳim, parashiyyot, and mishnayot. As the commentators point out, it varies frequently from the Sifra which the Talmudic authors knew; furthermore, entire passages known to the authors of the Babylonian Talmud are missing in the present Sifra, and, on the other hand, there are probably passages in the present Sifra which were not known to the Babylonian Talmud.

The Sifra frequently agrees with the Judean rather than with the Babylonian tradition; and Tosefta, Sheḳ. 1:7 likewise agrees with the Sifra. In the few cases where the agreement is with the Babylonian Talmud, it must not be assumed that the text of the Sifra was emended in agreement with the Babylonian Talmud, but that it represents the original version. The Babylonian Talmud, as compared with Yerushalmi, cites Sifra less accurately, sometimes abbreviating and sometimes amplifying it. The Babylonian Talmud occasionally makes use, in reference to the Sifra, of the rule "mi she-shanah zu lo shanah zu" (i.e., the assigning of different parts of one halakah to different authorities), but unnecessarily, since it is possible to harmonize the apparently conflicting sentences and thereby show that they may be assigned to the same authority.

Many errors have crept into the text through the practice of repeating one and the same midrash in similar passages.

== Editions ==
The Sifra is usually still cited according to the Weiss edition of 1862.

The editions of the Sifra are as follows: Venice, 1545; with commentary by RABaD, Constantinople, 1552; with Ḳorban Aharon, Venice, 1609; with the same commentary, Dessau, 1742; with commentary by J.L. Rapoport, Wilna, 1845; with commentary by Judah Jehiel, Lemberg, 1848; with commentary by Malbim (Meir Loeb b. Yehiel Michael), Bucharest, 1860; with commentary by RABaD and Massoret ha-Talmud by I. H. Weiss, Vienna, 1862 (Reprint New York: Om Publishing Company 1946); with commentary by Samson of Sens and notes by MaHRID, Warsaw, 1866. A Latin translation is given in Biagio Ugolini, Thesaurus, xiv.

Other editions include:

- Sifra d'vei rav. Edited by Meir Friedmann (Meir Ish Shalom). Breslau 1915.
- Sifra or Torat Kohanim. Edited by Finkelstein, Louis and Morris Lutzki . New York: JTS, 1956. (Facsimile edition of Codex Assemani 66 of the Vatican Library)
- Sifra on Leviticus I-V. Edited by Louis Finkelstein. New York: JTS 1989–1990.
- Sifra: An Analytical Translation I-III. Translated by Jacob Neusner. Atlanta: Scholars Press 1988.
- Sifra on Leviticus, with traditional commentaries and variant readings. Edited by Abraham Shoshanah. Cleveland and Jerusalem 1991 onwards.
