= Simeon ben Menasya =

Late 2nd/early 3rd century Judean rabbi

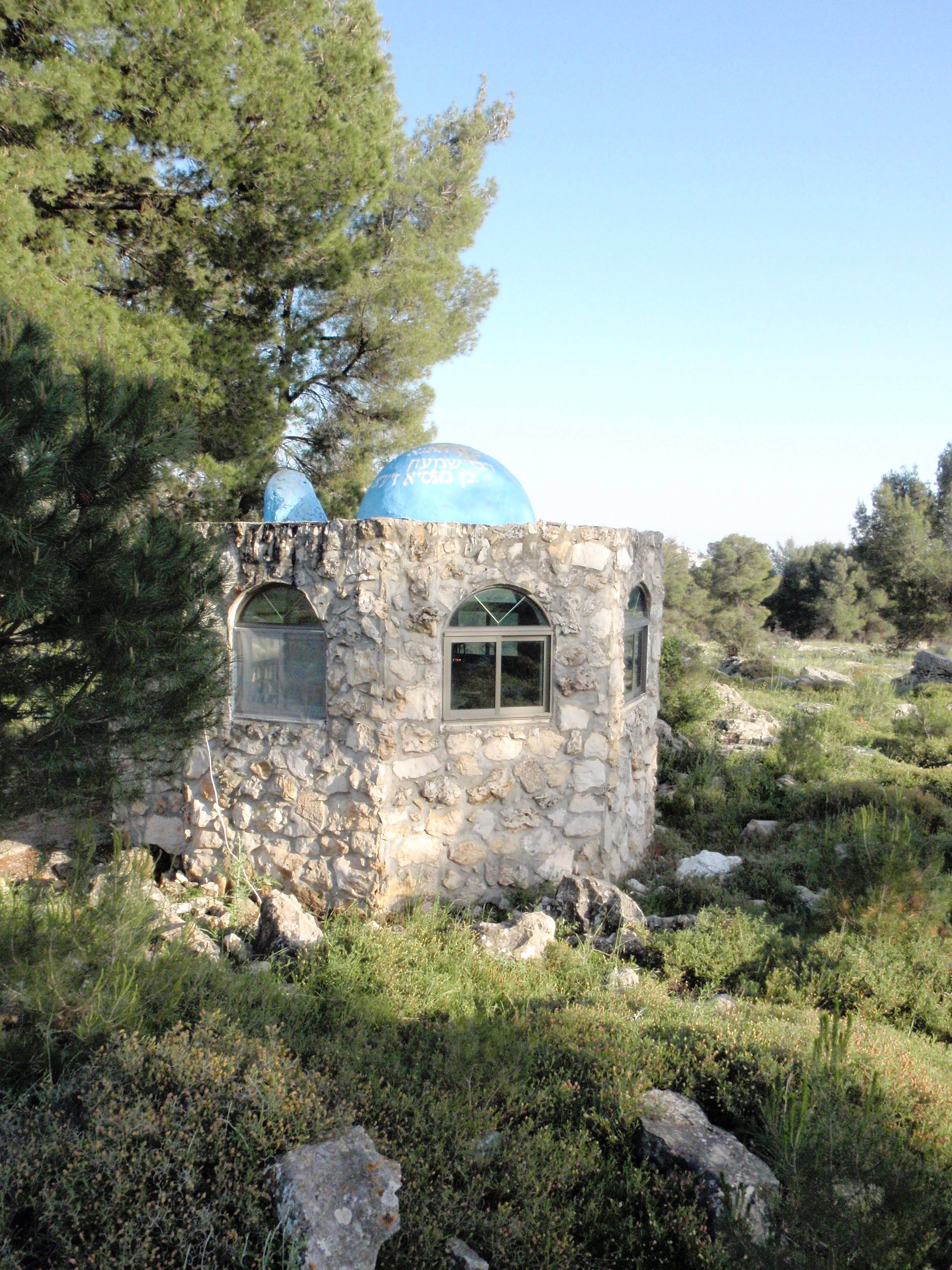
Tomb of Shim’on ben Menasya, Galilee, Israel

Shim’on ben Menasya (Hebrew: שמעון בן מנסיא) was a Jewish rabbi who lived in the late 2nd-early 3rd centuries (fourth and fifth generations of Tannaim).

== Biography ==
He was a contemporary of R. Judah ha-Nasi, with whom he engaged in a halakhic dispute. He was somewhat older than Judah, yet he immensely respected Judah and spoke in Judah's praise.

He and Jose ben Meshullam formed a group called "Kahal Kadosh" (the Holy Community) or "Edah Kedosha", because its members devoted one-third of the day to the study of the Torah, one-third to prayer, and the remaining third to work. The group is recorded as being located in Jerusalem, surprising given that Hadrian banned Torah study and practice in Jerusalem after the Bar Kochba revolt. Modern scholarly opinions differ on whether the ban was eventually rescinded, not enforced, or if this community carried on their activities secretly and in great danger.

== Teachings ==
=== Halacha ===
He is mentioned once in the Mishnah, though some consider this a later addition. Some halakhic teachings by him have been preserved elsewhere. Following Proverbs 17:14, Simeon says that a judge may call upon the parties to accept a compromise; but once the judge has heard the statements of both parties, or made up his mind as to the nature of his decision, he must decide according to the letter of the law.

=== Aggadah ===
Referring to Psalms 44:23, he says, "It is not possible for one to be killed every day; but God reckons the life of the pious as though they died a martyr's death daily".

He says that "Song of Songs was inspired by the Holy Ghost, while Ecclesiastes expresses merely the wisdom of Solomon".

His interpretation of Exodus 31:14 - "The words '[it is holy] unto you' imply that the Sabbath is given to you, and that you are not given to the Sabbath" - is noteworthy for paralleling a saying of Jesus.
