= There is no chronological order in the Torah =

There is no chronological order in the Torah (Hebrew: אין מוקדם ומאוחר בתורה, literally "There is no early and late in the Torah") is an expression used by many Bible commentators when they encounter events which are out of chronological order. In rabbinic analysis, the issue of chronological order is related to the issue of semichut parshiyot (whether one can learn from one section of the Biblical text about another section which is adjacent to it).

== Sources ==
Seemingly, the expression was first used in the Baraita on the Thirty-two Rules, which is traditionally attributed to Eliezer ben Jose (a 2nd-century tanna). However this teaching is historically dated to the tenth century. The term first appears in the Mekhilta of Rabbi Ishmael (c. 3rd century), and also in the Mekhilta of Rabbi Shimon, Sifre on Numbers, and the Jerusalem Talmud.

The Babylonian Talmud proves that "There is no chronological order in the Torah" from the fact that Numbers 9:1 occurred on the first day of Nisan, while the earlier verse Numbers 1:1 occurred on the first day of Iyyar, a month later. In the ensuing discussion, Rav Pappa limits the application of the rule to cases of different matter, but within a single topic he says the Torah's narrative must be chronological. Later commentators disagree over the definition of a "matter": Rashi defines it as a parashah, while Rabbeinu Hananel defines it as a single topic of discussion.

The first Bible commentator to use the term was Rashi, who used it frequently, as did Ibn Ezra and the Torah Temimah. In contrast, Nachmanides argued that the Torah's order is generally chronological. Raavan argued that the principle only applies in the Torah, and not in the Nevi'im or Ketuvim. Yoel Bin-Nun argued that the Torah is chronological except where it specifies otherwise.

== Examples ==
The commandments in Leviticus 25 are stated as being given to Moses "on Mount Sinai", seemingly earlier in time than the ritual commandments of Leviticus chapters 1–24. Ibn Ezra explains that Leviticus 25 was indeed given before the ritual commandments, but was recorded later due to its thematic connection to the passages around it (Leviticus 18 and 26). In contrast, Nachmanides asserts that the passage is in chronological order, as only at this point did Moses relay to the people the commands he had previously been given on Mount Sinai.

== Shimon Bar Yohai and the Sifre Zuta ==
The footprint of Shimon bar Yohai's influence in this territory--though elaborated in continuations, redactions and compilations--is especially pronounced within the commentaries out of whom this hermeneutic principle about chronology arises and crystallizes. Bar Yohai's esoteric influence on how the Torah is transmitted and received within the tradition surfaces more apparently (and less precisely), according to popular apprehensions, later on: In particular, when his name reappears as the main voice who speaks from the text of the Zohar. But the reputation which leads to his election in the Zohar's efflorescence is established at this prior layer within the stratigraphy of the commentary.

== Late developments ==
The influence of cognitive dexterity demanded and built-up by this kind of reading manifests, also, in later doctrines of space and time represented (by their negation, synthesis or semi-symmetrical mirror-inversion) in theoretical physics during the early twentieth 20th century up to the present.

In conversation with Gershom Scholem in 1916, Walter Benjamin remarks on the fusion of these developments in theology, historical memory and physical theory in a 'difficult remark,' saying, "The years can be counted but they cannot be numbered."

In the same year Benjamin elaborates this cryptic comment in a notebook, writing:

"Historical time is infinite in all directions and unfulfilled at every moment. [...] For empirical events, time is nothing but a form. More importantly, as a form, it is unfulfilled.[...] We should not think of time as merely the measure that records the duration of a mechanical change. Although such time is indeed a relatively empty form, to think of its being filled makes no sense. Historical time, however, differs from this mechanical time. It determines much more than the possibility of spatial changes of a specific magnitude and regularity-that is to say, like the hands of a clock-simultaneously with spatial changes of a complex nature [...] This idea of fulfilled time is the dominant historical idea of the Bible: it is the idea of messianic time. Moreover, the idea of a fulfilled historical time is never identical with the idea of an individual time."
