= Jose ben Zimra =

Israeli scholar and religious

Jose ben Zimra (or Jose b. Zimra; Hebrew: רבי יוסי בן זמרה) was Jewish rabbi of the 2nd-3rd centuries (sixth generation of tannaim), who lived during the transition period between the eras of the tannaim and the amoraim.

He was a kohen. He came from a privileged background family and his son married Judah haNasi's daughter. According to some, he was a descendant of King David.

Most of his teachings deal with the aggadah, and most of them were delivered by his student Eleazar ben Pedat, in Jose's name.

He spoke frequently against the sin of lashon hara.

== Grave ==
The moshav Kerem Ben Zimra is named after him, due to a modern tradition that he is buried in that area. Beginning in the 14th century, a certain "Zimra" is attributed to the area, which eventually evolved into a tradition that Jose ben Zimra was buried there. The 14th-century Travelogue of a Student of Nachmanides records:

We traveled two parasangs from Gush Halab to Alma, and by the road, half a parasang from Gush Halab, was Rabbi Zimra.

Moses Bassola (1523) wrote:

We went to the place called Ras al-Ahmar, and there on a tall hill is Rabbi Zimra with a tomb built over him, from which one can see most of the Galilean heights.

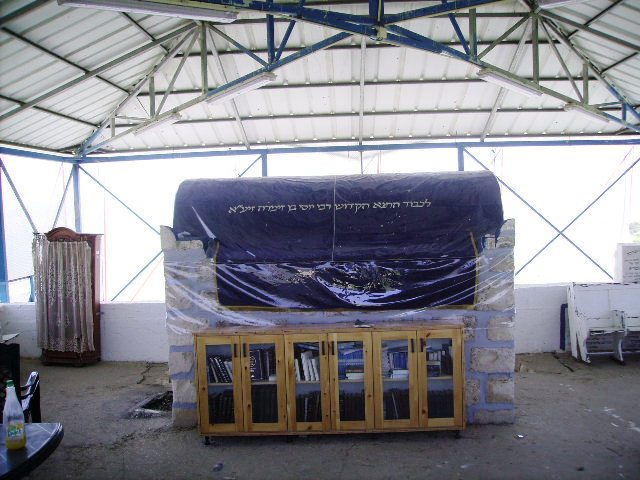
"Tomb of Jose ben Zimra" at Moshav Kerem Ben Zimra.

This tradition was later expanded to included Jose ben Zimra as well. Moses Yerushalmi (1769) wrote:

Ras al-Ahmar: The village is a ruin, but Rabbi Zimra and his son Rabbi Yose ben Zimra are buried there beneath a cairn, and not far from there is a cave in which twenty geonim are buried.
