= Baraita of Rabbi Ishmael =

Rules of Torah interpretation attributed to Rabbi Ishmael

The Baraita of Rabbi Ishmael (Hebrew: ברייתא דרבי ישמעאל) is a baraita that explains the 13 rules of Rabbi Ishmael and their application, employing illustrations from the Torah. The name is inaccurately given also to the first part of the Baraita, which only enumerates the 13 rules. The Baraita constitutes the introduction to the Sifra and precedes it in all editions, containing principles that are given their application in the Sifra. The Hekalot is also called by some the "Baraita of R. Ishmael."

== The 13 Rules ==
The thirteen rules were compiled by Rabbi Yishmael ben Elisha Nahmani ben Elisha for the elucidation of the Torah and making halakic deductions from it. They are, strictly speaking, mere amplifications of the seven rules of Hillel the Elder, and are collected in the Baraita of Rabbi Ishmael, forming the introduction to the Sifra and reading as follows:

1. Kal va-ḥomer: a minore ad maius - an argument that denotes an inference from smaller to bigger and vice versa (Identical with the first rule of Hillel).
2. Gezerah shavah: an analogy or inference from one verse to another (Identical with the second rule of Hillel).
3. Binyan av: Rules deduced from a single passage of Scripture and rules deduced from two passages. (This rule is a combination of the third and fourth rules of Hillel.)
4. Kelal u-Peraṭ: The general and the particular.
5. u-Peraṭ u-kelal: The particular and the general.
6. Kelal u-Peraṭ u-kelal: The general, the particular, and the general.
7. The general which requires elucidation by the particular, and the particular which requires elucidation by the general.
8. The particular implied in the general and excepted from it for pedagogic purposes elucidates the general as well as the particular.
9. The particular implied in the general and excepted from it on account of the special regulation which corresponds in concept to the general, is thus isolated to decrease rather than to increase the rigidity of its application.
10. The particular implied in the general and excepted from it on account of some other special regulation which does not correspond in concept to the general, is thus isolated either to decrease or to increase the rigidity of its application.
11. The particular implied in the general and excepted from it on account of a new and reversed decision can be referred to the general only in case the passage under consideration makes an explicit reference to it.
12. Deduction from the context.
13. When two Biblical passages contradict each other the contradiction in question must be solved by reference to a third passage.

Rules seven to eleven are formed by a subdivision of the fifth rule of Hillel; rule twelve corresponds to the seventh rule of Hillel, but is amplified in certain particulars; rule thirteen does not occur in Hillel, while, on the other hand, the sixth rule of Hillel is omitted by Ishmael. With regard to the rules and their application in general, see also Talmudical hermeneutics.

== Jewish Encyclopedia bibliography ==
- In addition to the works on Talmudic methodology. see Œuvres Complètes de Saadia, ix. 73-83 (commentary of Saadia on the thirteen rules), xxiii.-xxxiii., Paris, 1897.
