= Eleazar ha-Kappar =

Early 3rd century Jewish rabbi

Eleazar ha-Kappar (Hebrew: אלעזר הקפר) was a Jewish rabbi of the fifth and last generation of the tannaim. He was a colleague of Judah ha-Nasi and was in the company of him occasionally. He spent most of his life at ancient Katzrin. He was the father of bar Kappara, who is sometimes cited by the same name. He had a nephew named Hiyya, who was known for his pleasant voice.

== Teachings ==
He is cited infrequently in the Mishnah, but more often in the Talmud and works of midrash, on both halachic and aggadic topics.

In Derekh Eretz Zutta 9:1, he teaches a long list of ethical rules.

=== Quotes ===
- Jealousy, lust, and ambition put a man out of the world. Pirkei Avot 4:21
- The synagogues and study halls in Babylonia will in the time to come be planted in the Land of Israel. Megillah 29a
- Great is peace, for all blessings conclude with peace. Sifre Numbers 42; compare Numbers Rabbah 11:7; referring to Numbers 6:26
- When wine (whose gematria is 70) enters, a secret (whose gematria is also 70) comes out. Tanhuma (Buber) Shmini 7:6

== Archaeological finding ==
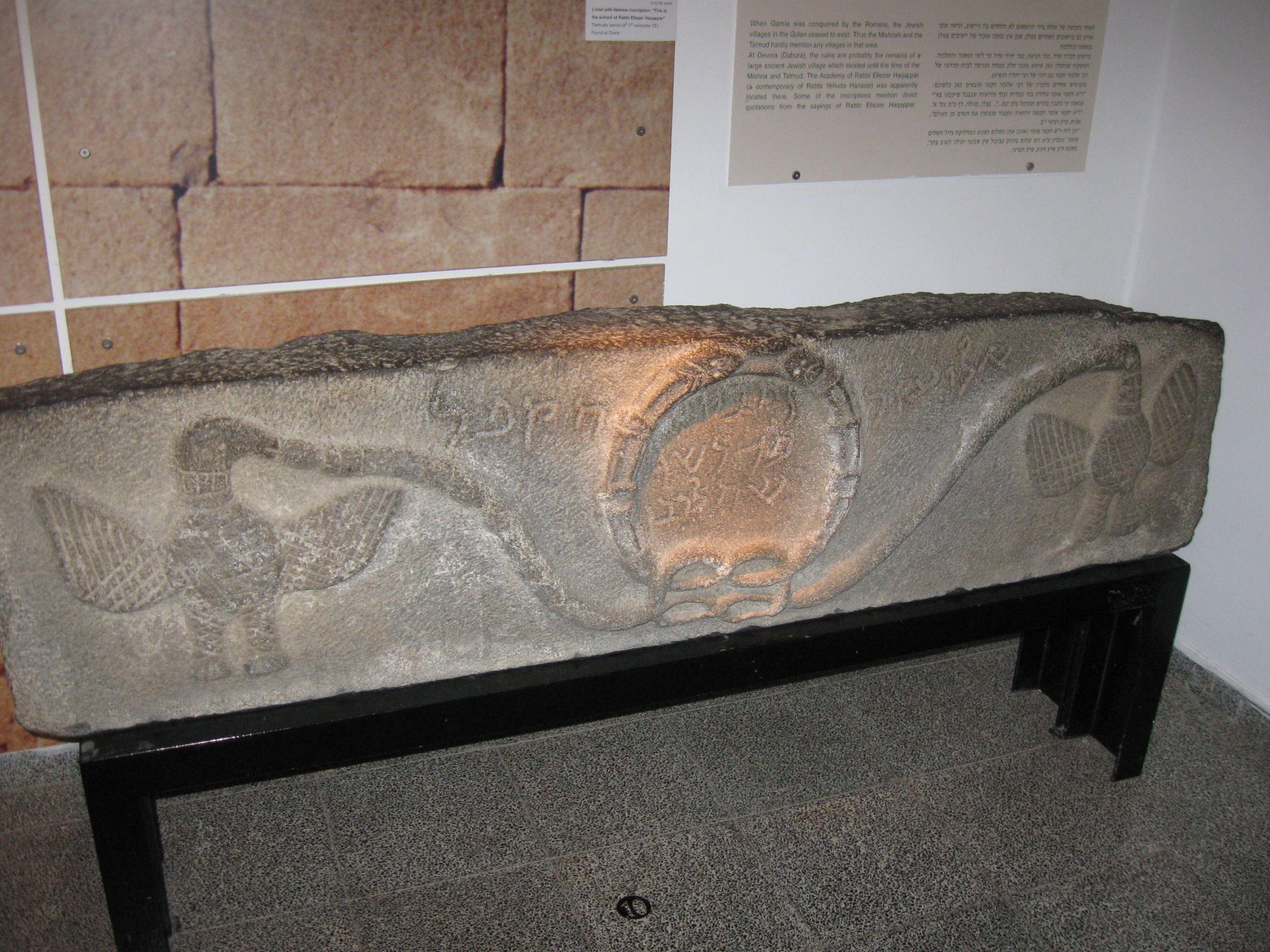
Lintel from Eliezer ha-Kappar's study house

In a mosque in Dabbura in the central Golan Heights, a lintel was discovered decorated with two birds of prey, holding nosegay in their beaks. The lintel bears the inscription:

זה בית מדרשו שהלרבי אליעזר הקפר
This is the beth midrash [house of learning] of Rabbi Eliezer ha-Kappar.)

This is the only archaeological finding from the era of the Tannaim in which the term "beit midrash" appears. The lintel is exhibited at the Golan Archaeological Museum in Katzrin.

Eleazar himself is noted for a saying in praise of humility, which is used as a metaphor for the lintel and other parts of a door:

R. Elazar HaKappar says: Do not be like the upper lintel, which a person's hand cannot touch. Nor like the upper bar, which wounds faces [that bang into it]. Nor like the middle bar, which bruises legs [that bang into it]. Rather, be like the bottom threshold, which everyone tramples, but even if eventually the building is destroyed, it remains in place.

— Avot of Rabbi Natan 26:6
