= Jose ben Halafta =

2nd century Talmud rabbi and tanna

Jose ben Helpetha, (Note: See Halafta for pronunciations.) commonly known as Jose ben Halafta (IPA: [ˈjosi ben xaˈlafta]) was a tanna of the fourth generation (2nd century CE). He is the fifth-most-frequently mentioned sage in the Mishnah. Yose Ben Halafta is the one of two rabbis called Rabbi Yose in the Talmud; the other being Jose ben Zimra, an amora.

== Biography ==
He was born at Sepphoris; but his family was of Babylonian-Jewish origin. According to a genealogical chart found at Jerusalem, he was a descendant of Jonadab ben Rechab. He was one of Rabbi Akiva's five principal pupils, called "the restorers of the Law," who were afterward ordained by Judah ben Baba. He was also a student of Johanan ben Nuri, whose halakhot he transmitted and of Eutolemus. It is very likely that he studied much under his father, Halafta, whose authority he invokes in several instances. But his principal teacher was Akiva, whose system he followed in his interpretation of the Law.

After having been ordained in violation of a Roman edict, Jose fled to Asia Minor, where he stayed till the edict was abrogated. Later he settled at Usha, then the seat of the Sanhedrin. As he remained silent when his fellow pupil Simeon bar Yohai once attacked the Roman government in his presence, he was forced by the Romans to return to Sepphoris, which he found in a decaying state. He established there a flourishing school; and it seems that he died there.

Jose's great learning attracted so many pupils that the words "that which is altogether just shalt thou follow" were interpreted to mean in part "follow Jose to Sepphoris". He was highly extolled after his death. His pupil Judah ha-Nasi said: "The difference between Jose's generation and ours is like the difference between the Holy of Holies and the most profane."

Owing to Jose's fame as a saint, legend describes him as having met Elijah. Jose, complying with the levirate law, married the wife of his brother who had died childless; they had five sons: Ishmael, Eleazar, Menahem, Halafta (who died in his lifetime), and Eudemus.

He exemplified Abtalion's dictum, "Love work"; for he was a tanner, a trade then commonly held in contempt.

== Teachings ==
=== Halakha ===
His legal decisions are mentioned throughout the greater part of the Mishnah, as well as in the Baraita and Sifra. The Babylonian Talmud says that in a dispute between Rabbi Jose b. Halafta and Rabbi Shimon Bar Yochai, the halakha follows Rabbi Jose b. Halafta. So, too, in any dispute between himself and his colleagues, Rabbi Yehuda b. 'Ilai and Rabbi Meir, the rule of practice is in accordance with Rabbi Jose.

His teaching was very systematic. He was opposed to controversy, declaring that the antagonism between the schools of Shammai and Hillel made it seem as if there were two Torahs. For the most part, Jose adopted a compromise between two contending halakhists. Like his master Akiva, Jose occupied himself with the dots which sometimes accompany the words in the Bible, occasionally basing his halakhot on such dots. He was generally liberal in his halakhic decisions, especially in interpreting the laws concerning fasts and vows.

=== Aggadah ===
Jose was also a prominent aggadist. The conversation which he had with a Roman matron, resulting in her conviction of the superiority of the Jewish religion, shows his great skill in interpreting Biblical verses.

Jose is considered to be the author of the Seder Olam Rabba, a chronicle from the creation to the time of Hadrian, for which reason it is called also known as "Baraita di Rabbi Jose ben Halafta." This work, though incomplete and too concise, shows Jose's system of arranging material in chronological order.

Jose is known for his ethical dicta, which are characteristic, and in which he laid special stress on the study of the Torah. A series of Jose's ethical sayings shows his tendency toward Essenism. As has been said above, Jose was opposed to disputation. When his companion Judah desired to exclude Meïr's disciples from his school, Jose dissuaded him. One of his characteristic sayings is, "He who indicates the coming of the Messiah, he who hates scholars and their disciples, and the false prophet and the slanderer, will have no part in the future world." According to Bacher this was directed against the Hebrew Christians.

=== Quotes ===
- Let your friend's money be as precious to you as your own, and prepare yourself for the study of the Torah since it (i.e. learning and knowledge) is not passed down unto you by way of an inheritance.
- What does the trickster lose?
- If any man says to you, 'There is worldly wisdom to be found among the gentiles,' believe him. But if he says to you, 'The Divine Law (Torah) is to be found among the gentiles,' do not believe him.
- There are three things that can potentially cause death, and all three having been delivered unto the woman: The commandment of the menstruate (i.e. to separate herself from her husband during her natural purgation); the commandment of the dough offering (i.e. to separate the portion unto the priestly stock before eating the bread), and the commandment of lighting the [Shabbat] candle (i.e. before the Sabbath actually sets in).

== Resources ==
Schechter, Solomon and M. Seligsohn. "Jose ben Ḥalafta." Jewish Encyclopedia. Funk and Wagnalls, 1901–1906; which cites:

- Bacher, Ag. Tan. ii. 150–190;
  - idem, Ag. Pal. Amor. ii. 158 et passim;
- Brüll, Mebo ha-Mishnah, pp. 156–160, 178–185, Frankfort-on-the-Main, 1876;
- Frankel, Darke ha-Mishnah, pp. 164–168;
  - idem, in Monatsschrift, iv. 206–209;
- Joël, ib. vi. 81–91;
- Weiss, Dor, ii. 161–164.
