= Bar Kappara =

Late 2nd/early 3rd century Jewish rabbi

Personal life
- Born: Eleazar (or Shimon) ben Eleazar ha-Kappar
- Died: Caesarea Maritima
- Parent: Eleazar ha-Kappar (father)
- Notable work: Mishnah of Bar Kappara

Religious life
- Religion: Judaism
- Sect: Rabbinic Judaism

Jewish leader
- Teacher: Judah ha-Nasi, Nathan the Babylonian, Jeremiah ben Eleazar
- Disciples: Hoshaiah Rabbah, Joshua ben Levi

Bar Kappara (Jewish Palestinian Aramaic: בר קפרא, romanized: bar qapparā) was a Jewish scholar of the late second and early third century CE (i.e., during the period between the tannaim and amoraim). He was active in Caesarea Maritima, the capital of the Roman province of Syria Palaestina, from around 180 to 220 CE. His name, meaning "Son of Qappara", was taken from his father, Eleazar ha-Kappar. He was one of the students of Judah ha-Nasi and a first-generation amora.

He was a talented poet and storyteller, and it is said that, at the wedding feast of Simeon ben Judah ha-Nasi, he kept the guests captivated with fables until their food got cold. His satirical wit, however, lost him the chance to be ordained as a rabbi.

== Name ==
His full name was Eleazar (there seems to be no ground for the form "Eliezer") ben Eleazar ha-Kappar. This is the form appearing in the tannaite sources, Tosefta and Sifre; the usual Talmudic form, "Bar Kappara," and the frequent appellation, "Eleazar ha-Kappar Berabbi", are abbreviations of this. According to a later source, his given name was Shimon rather than Eleazar.

In Ecclesiastes Rabbah, He is referred to as Abba bar Kappara.

== Narratives ==
Bar Kappara appears in a story in Ecclesiastes Rabbah where he entertains a party with stories about foxes, which were popular in Hellenistic culture:

Rabbi made a wedding feast for his son. Rabbi invited all the Rabbis but forgot to invite bar Kappara. [Bar Kappara] went and wrote on the gate of [Rabbi’s] house: After all your rejoicing there is death; and what is the profit in your rejoicing? [Rabbi] said: ‘Who did this to us?’ They said: ‘It was bar Kappara whom, alone, you forgot to invite, and he is disgraced.’ He went and made another feast and he invited all the rabbis and he invited bar Kappara. For each and every dish that [the waiter] would place before them, [bar Kappara] would recite three hundred parables about the fox. [The parables] were very pleasant for them, and the dishes grew cold and they did not taste them. Rabbi would say to his servants: ‘Why are the dishes going in and going out and they are not tasting anything?’ They said to him: ‘Because one of the elders who is sitting there, when the dish is taken in, he says three hundred parables regarding the fox. That is why the dishes are growing cold and they are not eating anything.’ He came to [bar Kappara] and said: ‘Why are you doing this? Let the diners eat.’ [Bar Kappara] said to him: ‘It is so you do not think that I came here because of your feast, but rather, it is because you did not invite me here with my colleagues.’ Is this not what Solomon said: “What profit is there for man [in all his toil that he toils under the sun]” (Ecclesiastes 1:3), since “one generation passes and one generation comes” (Ecclesiastes 1:4). After they placated each other, they were reconciled. Abba bar Kappara said to Rabbi: ‘If, in this world, which is not yours, the Holy One blessed be He granted you serenity, in the World to Come, which is entirely yours, all the more so.’

== Biography ==
Bar Kappara was a pupil of Judah ha-Nasi. His teachers seem to also include Nathan the Babylonian and Jeremiah ben Eleazar (probably identical with the Jeremiah mentioned in the Mekhilta of the Land of Israel and Sifre).

=== Conflict with Judah ha-Nasi ===
Bar Kappara and Judah ha-Nasi seem to have been opposites in personality, with Judah haNasi's princely grandeur contrasting with Bar Kappara's poetic abandon and vivacious attitude. Perhaps as a result, the two are recorded as coming into conflict in various ways. Judah initially refused to invite Bar Kappara to the wedding of Simeon bar Judah ha-Nasi, and after Judah changed his mind, Bar Kappara went on to mock Judah at the wedding. According to another source, Bar Kappara took revenge differently: at the feast which Judah subsequently gave in Bar Kappara's honor, the latter told a vast number of fox fables (300, it is reported) and the guests left the food untouched to listen to him.

On another occasion, Bar Kappara belittled Judah via riddle in the presence of Judah's son Simon. Judah, upon hearing of this from his son, informed Bar Kappara of his firm resolve never to grant him ordination. The Jerusalem Talmud tells a slightly different version of this story.

What Simeon's riddle signifies is unknown despite many attempts to explain it. The most probable view is Abraham Krochmal's, that Bar Kappara intended it as a criticism of Judah's unrelenting severity toward young and old. The verse is notable as an example of Hebrew poetry in Talmudic times; its few lines may be the sole testimony to the activity of the Jews of that time in secular poetry. Its language is classic but not slavishly so; forceful and pure, yet easy and flowing. Curiously, the one other preserved example of Bar Kappara's poetry is the eloquent words in which he proclaimed Judah ha-Nasi's death to the assembled people of Sepphoris: "Brethren of the house of Jedaiah [an epithet of the inhabitants of Sepphoris], listen to me! Mortals and angels have long been wrestling for the possession of the holy tablets of the Law; the angels have conquered. They have captured the tablets". Bar Kappara's presence in Sepphoris suggests that, despite Judah's attitude toward him, he appreciated his great obligations to his teacher; and that his grief for Judah's death was sincere.

=== Activity in Caesarea ===
His conflicts with Judah haNasi induced him to leave the Galilee for Caesarea, the capital city. The academy he set up there came to be a serious rival of Judah ha-Nasi's. Among the most important of its scholars were Hoshaiah Rabbah, "the father of the Mishnah", and Joshua ben Levi, the distinguished aggadist, who to a large extent transmitted bar Kappara's aggadic teachings. The greatest admirers of Judah ha-Nasi and supporters of Judah's patriarchial house, Hanina bar Hama and Johanan bar Nappaha, could not refrain from acknowledging Bar Kappara's greatness.

It is related that once while walking on the mole of Caesarea and seeing a Roman who had escaped from a shipwreck in utter destitution, he took him to his house and provided him with clothing and all necessaries, including money. Later, this castaway became proconsul of Caesarea, and occasion soon offered itself to show his gratitude to his rescuer, when Jews involved in a political disturbance were arrested, and he released them on bar Kappara's intervention.

In Avodah Zarah 31a.3, it is recounted that upon bar Kappara's death, Johanan bar Nappaha went to Parod to question people who may have remembered sayings that were passed down in the name of Bar Kappara. Nothing further is known of this place; Bacher suggests it may have been a suburb of Caesarea.

== Teachings ==
Bar Kappara was particularly known to the amoraim as the author of a compilation called the Mishnah of Bar Kappara. This work has not been preserved, and probably at the final redaction of the Talmud it was no longer extant. In fact, it is questionable whether the work ever reached Babylonia, as the one passage in the Bavli referring to it originated with Shimon ben Lakish, a Yerushalmi. In any case, the numerous passages from his Mishnah that found their way into the Talmud suffice for judgment upon its character. Menachem Meiri quite correctly designates it as a supplement to the Mishnah of Judah haNasi, intended chiefly to explain it, and, on rare occasions, to give differing opinions (see Baraita). It also presented variants to Judah haNasi's Mishnah, and later on became occasionally so interwoven in the text of the latter that doubt arose whether the Mishnah in question belonged to the one or to the other. The Mishnah of Bar Kappara was also used by the redactor of the Tosefta, who derived many decisions from it. Is. Halevy, however, denies the existence of Bar Kappara's Mishnah, without sufficient reason.

Bar Kappara ascribed great value to the study of astronomy: "He who can calculate the solstices and movements of the planets and fails to pay attention to these things, to him may be applied the verse (Isaiah 5:12) 'They regard not the works of the Lord, nor the operation of his hands". This statement is particularly striking when compared to his opinion about the obligation to study Torah: that a Jew who reads just two portions from the Torah daily—one in the morning and one in the evening—fulfills the commandment to meditate in God's law by day and night. Bar Kappara appreciated not only natural science, but also the Greek love of the beautiful. He explained Genesis 9:27 as follows: "The words of the Torah should be recited in the speech of Japheth (i.e. Greek) in the tents of Shem (i.e. in the synagogues and schools)".

Bar Kappara's respect for the exact sciences was equaled by his aversion for metaphysical speculation, which in his time flourished among Jews and Christians in the form of gnosis. Referring to Deuteronomy 4:32 ("Ask now of the past days, which were before you, since the day that God created man on the earth") Bar Kappara says, "Seek to know only of those days that followed Creation; but seek not to know what went before".

The Jerusalem Talmud contains a prayer he wrote and included in the repetition of the 18th section of Thanksgiving in the Amidah.

The sayings of Bar Kappara regarding the incense offering (qetoret) are recited thrice daily by Sephardic Jews (before and after Shacharit, and before Mincha); twice daily by Hasidic Jews (before Shacharit, and before Mincha); and once daily by Ashkenazi Jews (before Shacharit).

=== Quotes ===
- Which is a brief passage upon which all fundamentals of the Torah are dependent? "In all your ways acknowledge Him, and He will direct your paths" (Proverbs 3:6).
- A man should always teach his son a clean and easy profession.
