= Eurydemus ben Jose =

Eurydemus ben Jose (Hebrew: ר׳ אַבְדִימוֹס בֵּן ר׳ יוֹסֵי בֵּן חֲלַפְתָּא, romanized: R. Avdimos ben R. Yosei ben Ḥalafta) (Note: His name has also been transmitted as Avardimas (אֲװַרְדִימָס), Avirodimus (אבירודימוס), Vardimos (וַרְדִּימוֹס), and Vardimas (וַרְדִּימָס). As a basic form Bacher assumes "Eurydemus" (compare the Biblical רחבעם), a name which occurs in Herodotus. Jakob Levy and Alexander Kohut, on the other hand, favor the name "Eudaimon." Others, following the Palestinian sources, read all these names, "Avdimos," whom they identify with Menaḥem b. Jose (compare Abdimus ben R. Jose).) was one of the sons of Tanna Jose ben Ḥalafta. The few remarks ascribed to Eurydemus contain admonitions to benevolence.
