= Ishmael ben Jose =

Early 3rd century Judean rabbi

Ishmael ben Jose (Hebrew: רבי ישמעאל ברבי יוסי, read as Rabbi Ishmael beRabbi [Son of Rabbi] Yossi) was a rabbi who lived at the beginning of the 3rd century (fifth generation of tannaim). He was the son of Jose ben Halafta.

== Biography ==
Ishmael served as a Roman official together with Eleazar ben Simeon, and was instrumental in suppressing the many Jewish bandits who had appeared during the war between Severus and Pescennius Niger (193 CE). This activity was greatly resented by the Jews, who never forgave him for handing over fellow Jews to the Roman authorities for execution.

He had a wide knowledge of the Scriptures, and could write down from memory the whole of the Bible.

As a judge, Ishmael was noted for absolute integrity. His modest bearing called forth high praise from his master. Judah haNasi stated Isaiah 23:18 (which promises that the treasures of Tyre shall belong "to them who dwell before the Lord") refers to Ishmael ben Jose and to others who, like him, consider themselves as of little account, but for whom some day a greater glory waits.

Ishmael b. Jose was not on good terms with the Samaritans. Once, when he was passing through Neopolis on a pilgrimage to Jerusalem, the Samaritans jeeringly invited him to pray on Mount Gerizim instead of on "the dung hill" (Jerusalem); Ishmael retorted that the object of their worship was the idols hidden near Neopolis by Jacob. He also had occasional disagreements with Christians.

Once, compelled to say something agreeable about a very ugly woman, he in vain sought ground for a compliment, until he learned that her name was "Liḥluḥit" (the dirty one). "Ah!" said he, "there is something beautiful about her—her name, which suits her uncommonly well."

== Teachings ==
In halakhic literature, he is known for citating of his father's sayings which he transmitted to Judah haNasi, with whom he read Lamentations and the Psalms.

He explains the phrase "Lamenatzeach, a psalm to David" to mean "sing to Him who is happy when He is conquered", elaborating: "Come and behold! God's way is not man's way. One who is defeated is depressed, but God rejoices in being conquered" and citing Psalm 106:23 (where God rejoices at the fact that Moses convinced Him to spare Israel from punishment).

=== Quotes ===
- The disciples of the Sages, when they become old and aged, wisdom is added to them. The unlearned, when they become old and aged, senility is added unto them.
- Do not judge alone, for there is only One who may judge alone.
