= Jose ben Judah =

Late 2nd century Judean rabbi

Jose ben Judah (or R. Jose son of R. Judah; Hebrew: רבי יוסי ברבי יהודה, lit. Rabbi Yossi beRabbi [son of Rabbi] Yehuda) was a rabbi who lived at the end of the 2nd century CE (fifth generation of tannaim).

== Biography ==
His father was Rabbi Judah ben Ilai. He is often mentioned as disagreeing on halachic matters with his father or with rabbis of his father's generation, such as Rabbis Eleazar ben Shammua and Shimon bar Yochai. He was a contemporary of Rabbi Yehudah haNasi, with whom he had many halachic debates.

== Teachings ==
=== Halacha ===
Like his father, and through the teachings of his father, he was the depositary of many old traditions, which appear in his name.

Many of his halachic rulings are practically relevant, and extensively discussed by later rabbis. For example, he permits a kohen to pass over an impure place inside a "thrown tent", since it is considered a separate domain (relevant to modern discussions of an airplane flying over a graveyard), and he addresses the question of whether the chadash prohibition applies outside the Land of Israel.

He issued three commands to R' Yehudah HaNasi: not to go out alone at night, not to stand naked before a candle, and not to enter a newly built bathhouse (lest it collapse).

He insists that a convert must show his readiness to accept even the precepts of the sages in their capacity as interpreters of the Law.

=== Aggadah ===
On the expression hin tzedek he comments: “Let your yes (Hebrew: hen) be yes, and your no, no.” He explains Deuteronomy 8:5 thus: “Dear to God are the afflictions destined for man, for the glory of God rests on whoever they come, as it is said: ‘It is the Lord your God who chastises you’.”

He described the peacefulness of Sabbath as follows: “Two angels, a good and a bad one, accompany man on the Sabbath eve from the synagogue into his house. When the man finds the lamp lit, the table laid, and the bed made, the good angel prays: ‘May it be Thy will, O Lord, that it be the same next Sabbath!’ — to which the evil angel, against his will, responds ‘Amen!’ If, however, the man finds his house in disorder, the wicked angel says: ‘May it be the same next Sabbath!’ — to which, the good angel is forced to respond, ‘Amen!’”
