= Simeon ben Eleazar =

3rd century Jewish Tanna sage

Simeon ben Eleazar (or Simeon b. Eleazar; Hebrew: שמעון בן אלעזר, read as Shimon ben Eleazar) was a Jewish Tanna sage of the fifth generation.

== Biography ==
He is most likely the son of R. Eleazar ben Shammua.

He was a pupil of Rabbi Meir, whose teachings, both halakhic and aggadic, he transmitted. However, Maimonides, when he enumerated the generations of the Tannaim sages, reversed the order of the two, placing R. Simeon ben Eleazar as a contemporary of R. Akiva, whereas placing R. Meir in the following generation. R. Yom Tov Asevilli claims that there were two different Tanna sages with the same name of Simeon ben Eleazar, one in the previous generation to R. Meir, and the other in the following generation to R. Meir, and in that he had resolved the maze of Maimonides' statement.

It is told that once, when returning in a very joyful mood from the academy to his native city, he met an exceedingly ugly man who greeted him. Simeon did not return the greeting, and even mocked the man on account of his ugliness. When, however, the man said to him, "Go and tell the Master, who created me, how ugly His handiwork is," Simeon, perceiving that he had sinned, fell on his knees and begged the man's pardon. As the latter would not forgive him, Simeon followed him until they came to Simeon's city, when the inhabitants came out to meet him, greeting him respectfully as rabbi. The man thereupon said to them, "If this is a rabbi may there be few like him in Israel," and told them what had occurred; he, however, forgave Simeon when the people begged him to do so. Simeon went the same day to the school and preached a sermon, exhorting all the people to be pliable like a reed and not unbending like a cedar.

== Teachings ==
He is cited in the Mishnah only a few times, but on the Tosefta and baraitas' portions that are quoted in the Talmud his name is mentioned many times. In many of the classical texts of the baraita, in matters in dispute, he has stated a different version to these disputes cited in the Mishnah.

In halakhah, Simeon appears most frequently as the opponent of R. Judah ha-Nasi. Simeon formulated a rule for interpreting Biblical passages in which dots are placed over certain letters or entire words, in conformity with a tradition which was even then sanctioned: If the letters without dots exceed in number those with dots the exposition must be based on the letters without dots; but if the reverse be true, the letters with dots must be interpreted.

Like his teacher R. Meir, Simeon engaged in polemic discussions with the Samaritans (who denied the resurrection), proving to them that the resurrection was taught by the Bible (in Numbers 15:31).

=== Aggadah ===
Many aggadic teachings by Simeon have been preserved, including the following:

- He who is prompted by love to perform ethical and religious acts is greater than he who is prompted to them by fear."
- Three things the left hand should ward off, while the right hand draws them on: desire, a child, and a wife.
- Have you ever seen an animal that is obliged to follow a trade or that must painfully support itself? Yet animals were created for the purpose of serving man, while man was created to serve his Creator. Should not, therefore, man, rather than the animals, be able to support himself without toil? Man, however, has deteriorated in his works, and therefore in his nature, and has been deprived of his nourishment.
- When the old people say, 'Tear down,' and the young people say, 'Build,' listen to the old and not to the young; for the tearing down of the old people is building, and the building of the young people is tearing down, as the story of Rehoboam, the son of Solomon, teaches.
- The verse "You shall love your neighbor as thyself: I am the Lord" was uttered with a great oath; meaning "I, the Eternal One, have created him. If you love him, I will surely reward you for it; and if you love him not, then I am the judge ready to punish".
- Do not appease your friend in the hour of his anger... neither come into his house during the hour of his calamity, nor try and see him in the hour of his disgrace. ...Love him that reproves you, but hate him that speaks kindly of you (i.e. flatters you); since he that reproves you brings you into life of the world to come, but he that speaks kindly of you takes you out of this world.
- A wise man who dwells in the Land of Israel but who leaves to go abroad has defected. More praiseworthy than him is the person who dwells within it.

Some fine parables by Simeon have also been preserved.
