= Judah ha-Nasi =

2nd-century rabbi and editor of the Mishnah

Rabbi Judah ha-Nasi
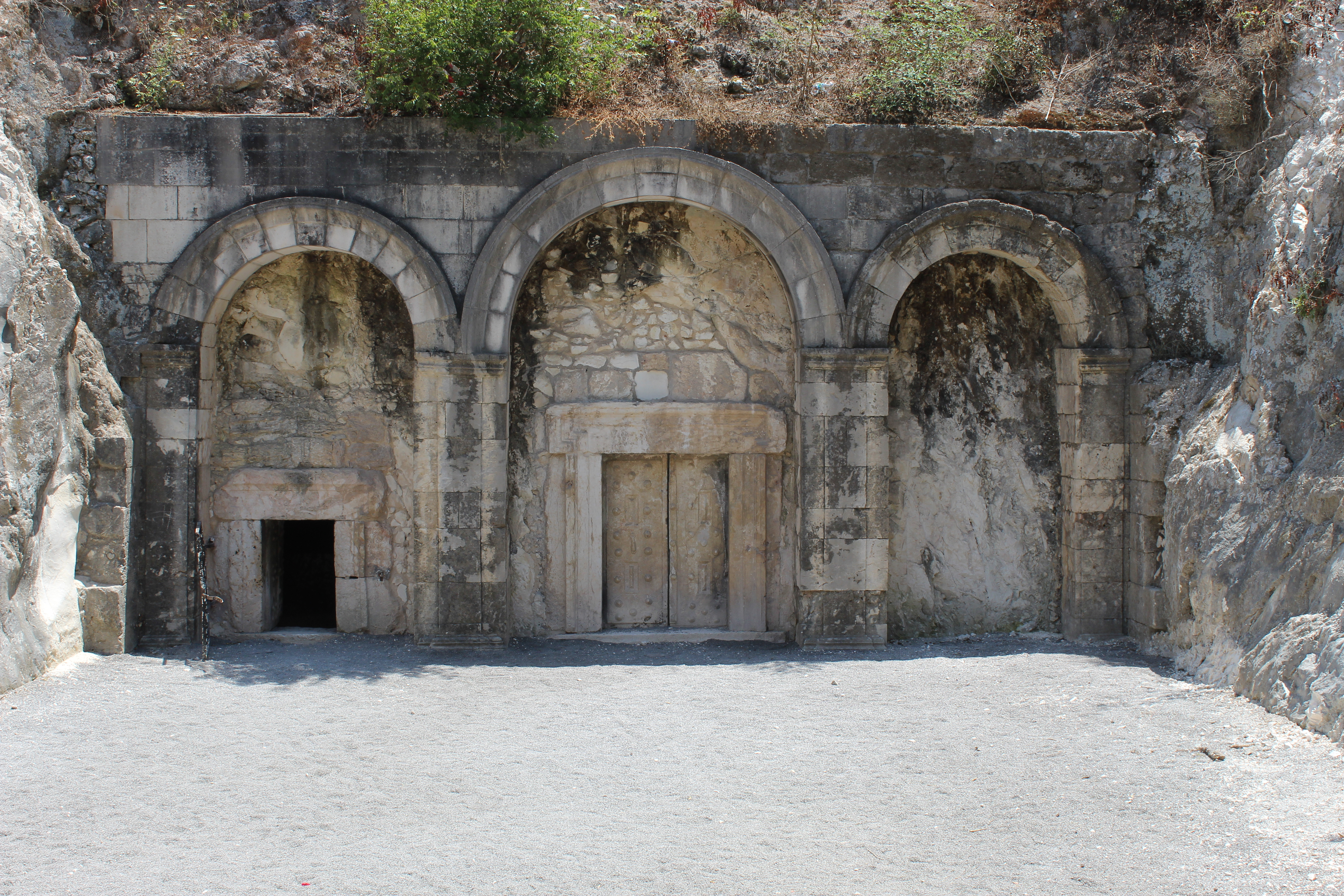
- The Burial Cave of Judah the Prince in Beit Shearim, Israel
- Born: Yehuda ben Shimon c. 135 CE; Judea, Roman Empire
- Died: c. 217 CE; Sepphoris, Roman Judea
- Other names: Yehuda HaNasi, Judah I, Rabi, Rabbi, Rebbi, Rabbenu HaKadosh
- Occupations: Rabbi, Tanna, Chief redactor of the Mishnah
- Known for: Compilation of the Mishnah, leadership of the Jewish community in Roman Judea
- Notable work: Mishnah

Judah ha-Nasi (Hebrew: יְהוּדָה הַנָּשִׂיא, yŭhûḏā hannāśîʾ) or Judah the Prince, was a second-century rabbi (a tanna of the fifth generation) and chief redactor and editor of the Mishnah. He lived from approximately 135 to 217 CE. He was a key leader of the Jewish community in Roman-occupied Judea after the Bar Kokhba revolt.

== Name and titles ==
The title nasi was used for presidents of the Sanhedrin. He was the first nasi to have this title added permanently to his name; in traditional literature he is usually called "Rabbi Yehuda ha-Nasi." Often though (and always in the Mishnah) he is simply called Rabbi "my teacher" (רַבִּי), the master par excellence. He is occasionally called Rabbenu "our master". He is also called "Rabbenu HaKadosh" "our holy master" (רַבֵּנוּ הַקָּדוֹשׁ) due to his deep piety.

== Biography ==
=== Youth ===
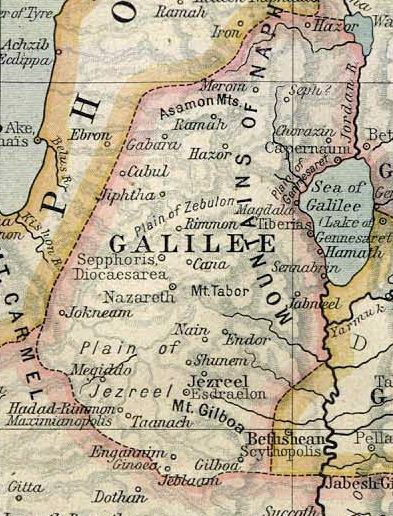
The Galilee in late antiquity

Judah was born in 135 in the newly-established Roman province of Syria Palaestina to Simeon ben Gamaliel II. According to the Talmud, he was of the Davidic line. He is said to have been born on the same day that Rabbi Akiva died as a martyr. The Talmud suggests that this was a result of divine providence: God had granted the Jewish people another leader of great stature to succeed Akiva. His exact place of birth is unknown.

Judah spent his youth in the city of Usha in the Lower Galilee. His father presumably gave him the same education that he had received, including Koine Greek. This knowledge of Greek enabled him to become the Jews' intermediary with the Roman authorities. He favoured Greek as the language of the country over Jewish Palestinian Aramaic. In Judah's house, only the Hebrew language was spoken, and the maids of the house became known for their use of obscure Hebrew terminology.

Judah devoted himself to the study of the oral and the written law. He studied under some of Akiva's most eminent students. As their student and through conversation with other prominent men who gathered about his father, he laid a strong foundation of scholarship for his life's work: the editing of the Mishnah.

=== His teachers ===
His teacher at Usha was Judah bar Ilai, who was officially employed in the house of the patriarch as judge in religious and legal questions. In later years, Judah described how in his childhood he read the Book of Esther at Usha in the presence of Judah bar Ilai.

Judah felt especial reverence for Jose ben Halafta, the student of Akiva's who had the closest relations with Simon ben Gamaliel. When, in later years, Judah raised objections to Jose's opinions, he would say: "We poor ones undertake to attack Jose, though our time compares with his as the profane with the holy!" Judah hands down a halakhah by Jose in Menachot 14a.

Judah studied from Shimon bar Yochai in Teqoa, a place some have identified with Meron. He also studied with Eleazar ben Shammua. Judah did not study with Rabbi Meir, evidently in consequence of the conflicts which distanced Meir from the house of the patriarch. However, he considered himself lucky even to have seen Meir from behind.

Another of Judah's teachers was Nathan the Babylonian, who also took a part in the conflict between Meir and the patriarch; Judah confessed that once, in a fit of youthful ardour, he had failed to treat Nathan with due reverence. In both halakhic and aggadic tradition, Judah's opinion is often opposed to Nathan's.

In the Jerusalemite tradition, Judah ben Korshai (the halakhic specialist mentioned as assistant to Simon ben Gamaliel) is designated as Judah's real teacher. Jacob ben Hanina (possibly the R. Jacob whose patronymic is not given and in whose name Judah quotes halakhic sentences) is also mentioned as one of Judah's teachers, and is said to have asked him to repeat halakhic sentences.

Judah was also taught by his father (Simon ben Gamaliel); when the two differed on a halakhic matter, the father was generally stricter. Judah himself says: "My opinion seems to me more correct than that of my father"; and he then proceeds to give his reasons. Humility was a virtue ascribed to Judah, and he admired it greatly in his father, who openly recognised Shimon bar Yochai's superiority, thus displaying the same modesty as the Bnei Bathyra when they gave way to Hillel, and as Jonathan when he voluntarily gave precedence to his friend David.

=== Leadership ===
Nothing is known regarding the time when Judah succeeded his father as leader of the Jews remaining in Eretz Yisrael. According to Rashi, Judah's father Simon had served as the nasi or head of the Sanhedrin in Usha before it moved to Shefar'am (now Shefa-'Amr). According to a tradition, the country at the time of Simon ben Gamaliel's death not only was devastated by a plague of locusts but suffered many other hardships.

From Shefar'am, the Sanhedrin transferred to Beit Shearim (now part of the Beit She'arim necropolis), where the Sanhedrin was headed by Judah. Here he officiated for a long time. Eventually, Judah moved with the court from Beit Shearim to Sepphoris, where he spent at least 17 years of his life. Judah chose Sepphoris chiefly because of his ill health would improve in its high altitude and pure air. However, Judah's memorial as a leader is principally associated with Bet She'arim: "The Sages taught: The verse states: “Justice, justice, shall you follow.” This teaches that one should follow the Sages to the academy where they are found. For example [...] after Rabbi Yehuda HaNasi to Beit She’arim[.]"

Among Judah's contemporaries in the early years of his activity were Eleazar ben Simeon, Ishmael ben Jose, Jose ben Judah, and Simeon ben Eleazar. His better-known contemporaries and students include Simon b. Manasseh, Pinchas ben Yair, Eleazar ha-Kappar and his son Bar Kappara, Hiyya the Great, Shimon ben Halafta, and Levi ben Sisi. Among his students who taught as the first generation of Amoraim after his death are: Hanina bar Hama and Hoshaiah Rabbah in Eretz Yisrael, Abba Arikha and Samuel of Nehardea in Babylon (the Jewish term for Lower Mesopotamia).

Only scattered records of Judah's official activity exist. These include: the ordination of his students; the recommendation of students for communal offices; orders relating to the announcement of the new moon; amelioration of the law relating to the Sabbatical year; and to decrees relating to tithes in the frontier districts of Eretz Yisrael. The last-named he was obliged to defend against the opposition of the members of the patriarchal family. The ameliorations he intended for Tisha B'Av were prevented by the college. Many religious and legal decisions are recorded as having been rendered by Judah together with his court, the college of scholars.

According to the Talmud, Rabbi Judah HaNasi was very wealthy and greatly revered in Rome. He had a close friendship with "Antoninus", possibly the Emperor Antoninus Pius, though it is more likely his famous friendship was with either Emperor Marcus Aurelius Antoninus or Antoninus who is also called Caracalla and who would consult Judah on various worldly and spiritual matters. Jewish sources tell of various discussions between Judah and Antoninus. These include the parable of the blind and the lame (illustrating the judgment of the body and the soul after death), and a discussion of the impulse to sin.

The authority of Judah's office was enhanced by his wealth, which is referred to in various traditions. In Babylon, the hyperbolic statement was later made that even his stable-master was wealthier than King Shapur. His household was compared to that of the emperor. Simeon ben Menasya praised Judah by saying that he and his sons united in themselves beauty, power, wealth, wisdom, age, honour, and the blessings of children. During a famine, Judah opened his granaries and distributed corn among the needy. But he denied himself the pleasures procurable by wealth, saying: "Whoever chooses the delights of this world will be deprived of the delights of the next world; whoever renounces the former will receive the latter".

=== Death ===
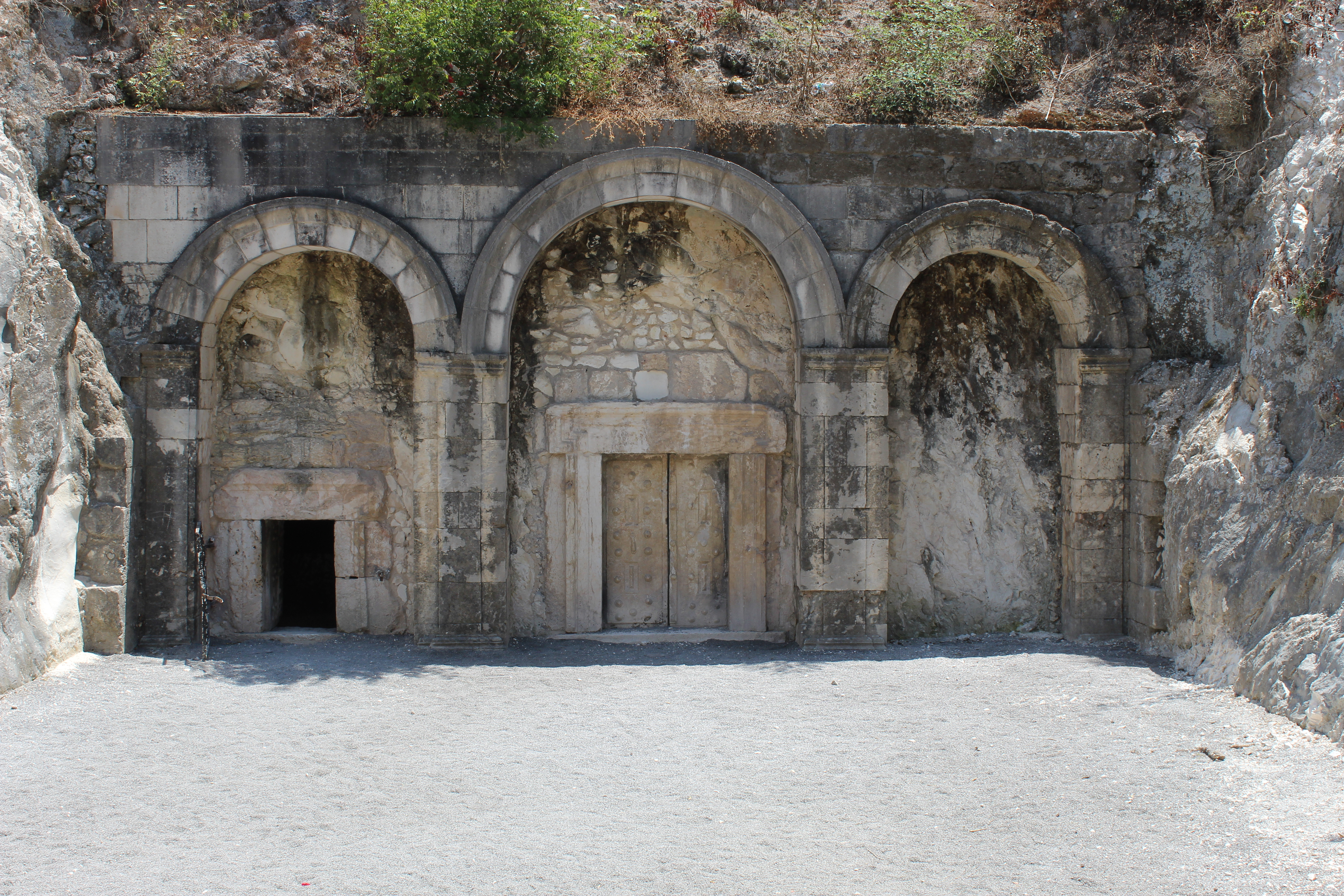
Catacomb no. 14, the Cave of Rabbi Judah ha-Nasi in Beit Shearim.

The year of Judah's death is deduced from the statement that his student Abba Arikha left Eretz Yisrael for good not long before Judah's death, in year 530 of the Seleucid era (219 CE). He assumed the office of patriarch during the reign of Marcus Aurelius and Lucius Verus (c. 165). Hence Judah, having been born about 135, became patriarch at the age of 30, and died at the age of about 85. The Talmud notes that Rabbi Judah the Prince lived for at least 17 years in Sepphoris, and that he applied unto himself the biblical verse, "And Jacob lived in the land of Egypt seventeen years" (Genesis 47:28).

According to a different calculation, he died on 15 Kislev, AM 3978 (around December 1, 217 CE), in Sepphoris, and his body was interred in the necropolis of Beit Shearim, 15.2 kilometres (9.4 mi) distant from Sepphoris, during whose funeral procession they made eighteen stops at different stations along the route to eulogise him.

It is said that when Judah died, no one had the heart to announce his demise to the anxious people of Sepphoris, until the clever Bar Ḳappara broke the news in a parable, saying: "The heavenly host and earth-born men held the tablets of the covenant; then the heavenly host was victorious and seized the tablets."

Judah's eminence as a scholar, who gave to this period its distinctive impression, was characterised at an early date by the saying that since the time of Moses, the Torah and greatness (i.e. knowledge and rank) were united in no one to the same extent as in Judah I.

Two of Judah's sons assumed positions of authority after his death: Gamaliel succeeded him as nasi, while Shimon became hakham of his yeshiva.

According to some Midrashic and Kabbalistic legends, Judah ha-Nasi had a son named Yaavetz who ascended to Heaven without experiencing death.

=== Talmudic narratives ===
Various stories are told about Judah, illustrating different aspects of his character.

It is said that once he saw a calf being led to the slaughtering-block, which looked at him with tearful eyes, as if seeking protection. He said to it: "Go; for you were created for this purpose!" Due to this unkind attitude toward the suffering animal, he was punished with years of illness. Later, when his maid was about to kill some small animals which were in their house, he said to her: "Let them live, for it is written: '[God's] tender mercies are over all his works'." After this demonstration of compassion, his illness ceased. Judah also once said, "One who is ignorant of the Torah should not eat meat." The prayer he prescribed upon eating meat or eggs also indicates an appreciation of animal life: "Blessed be the Lord who has created many souls, in order to support by them the soul of every living being."

He exclaimed, sobbing, in reference to three different stories of martyrs whose deaths made them worthy of future life: "One man earns his world in an hour, while another requires many years". He began to weep when Elisha ben Abuyah's daughters, who were soliciting alms, reminded him of their father's learning. In a legend relating to his meeting with Pinchas ben Yair, he is described as tearfully admiring the pious Pinchas' unswerving steadfastness, protected by a higher power. He was frequently interrupted by tears when explaining Lamentations 2:2 and illustrating the passage by stories of the destruction of Jerusalem and of the Temple. While explaining certain passages of Scripture, he was reminded of divine judgment and of the uncertainty of acquittal, and began to cry. Hiyya found him weeping during his last illness because death was about to deprive him of the opportunity of studying the Torah and of fulfilling the commandments.

Once, when at a meal his students expressed their preference for soft tongue, he made this an opportunity to say, "May your tongues be soft in your mutual intercourse" (i.e., "Speak gently without disputing").

Before he died, Judah said: "I need my sons! ... Let the lamp continue to burn in its usual place; let the table be set in its usual place; let the bed be made in its usual place."

==== His prayers ====
While teaching Torah, Judah would often interrupt the lesson to recite the Shema Yisrael. He passed his hand over his eyes as he said it.

When 70-year-old wine cured him of a protracted illness, he prayed: "Blessed be the Lord, who has given His world into the hands of guardians".

He privately recited daily the following supplication on finishing the obligatory prayers: "May it be Thy will, my God and the God of my fathers, to protect me against the impudent and against impudence, from bad men and bad companions, from severe sentences and severe plaintiffs, whether a son of the covenant or not."

=== Post-Talmudic narratives ===
Rabbi Judah ben Samuel of Regensburg relates that the spirit of Rebbi Judah used to visit his home, wearing Shabbat clothes, every Friday evening at dusk. He would recite Kiddush, and others would thereby discharge their obligation to hear Kiddush. One Friday night there was a knock at the door. "Sorry," said the maid, "I can't let you in just now because Rabbeinu HaKadosh is in the middle of Kiddush." From then on Judah stopped coming, since he did not want his coming to become public knowledge.

== Teachings ==
=== Compilation of the Mishnah ===
According to Rabbinical Jewish tradition, God gave both the Written Law (the Torah) and the Oral Law to Moses on biblical Mount Sinai. The Oral Law is the oral tradition as relayed by God to Moses and from him, transmitted and taught to the sages (rabbinic leaders) of each subsequent generation.

For centuries, the Torah appeared only as a written text transmitted in parallel with the oral tradition. Fearing that the oral traditions might be forgotten, Judah undertook the mission of consolidating the various opinions into one body of law which became known as the Mishnah. This completed a project which had been mostly clarified and organised by his father and Nathan the Babylonian.

The Mishnah consists of 63 tractates codifying Jewish law, which are the basis of the Talmud. According to Abraham ben David, the Mishnah was compiled by Rabbi Judah the Prince in 3949 AM, or the year 500 of the Seleucid era, which corresponds to 189 CE.

The Mishnah contains many of Judah's own sentences, which are introduced by the words, "Rabbi says."

The Mishnah was Judah's work, although it includes a few sentences by his son and successor, Gamaliel III, perhaps written after Judah's death. Both the Talmuds assume as a matter of course that Judah is the originator of the Mishnah—"our Mishnah," as it was called in Babylon—and the author of the explanations and discussions relating to its sentences. However, Judah is more correctly considered redactor of the Mishnah, rather than its author. The Mishnah is based on the systematic division of the halakhic material as formulated by Rabbi Akiva; Judah following in his work the arrangement of the halakot as taught by Rabbi Meir (Akiva's foremost student).

=== Halacha ===
Using the precedent of Rabbi Meir's reported actions, Judah ruled the Beit Shean region to be exempt from the requirements of tithing and shmita regarding produce grown there. He also did the same for the cities of Kefar Tzemach, Caesarea and Beit Gubrin.

He forbade his students to study in the marketplace, basing his prohibition on his interpretation of Song of Songs 7:2, and censured one of his students who violated this restriction.

=== Biblical interpretation ===
His exegesis includes many attempts to harmonise conflicting Biblical statements. Thus he harmonises the contradictions between Genesis 15:13 ("400 years") and 15:16 ("the fourth generation"); Exodus 20:16 and Deuteronomy 5:18; Numbers 9:23, 10:35 and ib., Deuteronomy 14:13 and Leviticus 11:14. The contradiction between Genesis 1:25 (which lists 3 categories of created beings) and 1:24 (which adds a fourth category, the "living souls") Judah explains by saying that this expression designates the demons, for whom God did not create bodies because the Sabbath had come.

Noteworthy among the other numerous Scriptural interpretations which have been handed down in Judah's name are his clever etymological explanations, for example: Exodus 19:8-9; Leviticus 23:40; Numbers 15:38; II Samuel 17:27; Joel 1:17; Psalms 68:7.

He interpreted the words "to do the evil" in II Samuel 12:9 to mean that David did not really sin with Bathsheba, but only intended to do so. As she was actually divorced at the time he took her. Abba Arikha, Judah's student, ascribes this apology for King David to Judah's desire to justify his ancestor. A sentence praising King Hezekiah and an extenuating opinion of King Ahaz have also been handed down in Judah's name. Characteristic of Judah's appreciation of aggadah is his interpretation of the word "vayagged" (Exodus 19:9) to the effect that the words of Moses attracted the hearts of his hearers, like the aggadah does. Once when the audience was falling asleep in his lecture, he made a ludicrous statement in order to revive their interest, and then explained the statement to be accurate in a metaphorical sense.

Judah was especially fond of the Book of Psalms. He paraphrased the psalmist's wish "Let the words of my mouth ... be acceptable in thy sight," thus: "May the Psalms have been composed for the coming generations; may they be written down for them; and may those that read them be rewarded like those that study halakhic sentences". He said that the Book of Job was important if only because it presented the sin and punishment of the generations of the Flood. He proves from Exodus 16:35 that there is no chronological order in the Torah. Referring to the prophetic books, he says: "All the Prophets begin with denunciations and end with comfortings". Even the genealogical portions of the Book of Chronicles must be interpreted.

It appears that there was an aggadic collection containing Judah's answers to exegetical questions. Among these questions may have been the one which Judah's son Simeon addressed to him.

=== Other quotes ===
- What is the right way for man to choose? That which is honorable in his own eyes (i.e. approved by his conscience), and, at the same time, honorable in the eyes of his fellow-men.
- Be as careful with a light mitzvah as a serious one, for you do not know the reward given for mitzvot. Calculate the loss of a mitzvah against its gain, and the gain of a sin against its loss. Look at three things and you will not come to sin: Know what is above you, an eye seeing and an ear listening, and all your deeds are written in a book.
- Look not at the jar, but upon what is inside; many a new jug is full of old wine; and many an old jug does not even contain new wine.
- Much have I learned from my teachers; more from my colleagues; but most from my students.
- Why is the story of the Nazirite juxtaposed to the story of the suspected adulteress? In order to tell you that anyone who sees a suspected adulteress in her corrupted state, he should put himself under a vow never again to drink wine.
- Let your secret be known only to yourself; and do not tell your neighbor anything which you perceive may not fitly be listened to.
- Great is work, for whoever does not work, people speak about him: From what does that man eat? From what does he drink? ... Great is work, for whoever works, his hand is never missing a prutah.

Jewish titles
Preceded by Shimon ben Gamliel II	Nasi c. 165–220	Succeeded by Gamaliel III
