= Shlach =

Annual Jewish cycle of Torah reading

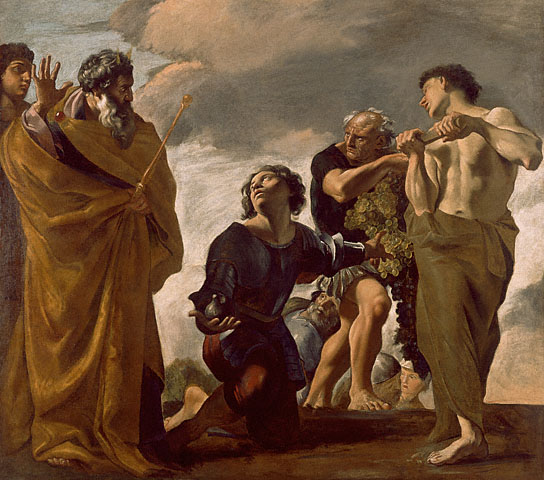
Moses and the Messengers from Canaan (painting by Giovanni Lanfranco)

Shlach, Shelach, Sh'lah, Shlach Lecha, or Sh'lah L'kha (שְׁלַח or שְׁלַח-לְךָ—Hebrew for "send", "send to you", or "send for yourself") is the 37th weekly Torah portion (פָּרָשָׁה, parashah) in the annual Jewish cycle of Torah reading and the fourth in the Book of Numbers. Its name comes from the first distinctive words in the parashah, in Numbers 13:2. Shelach (שְׁלַח) is the sixth and lecha (לְךָ) is the seventh word in the parashah. The parashah tells the story of the twelve spies sent to assess the promised land, commandments about offerings, the story of the Sabbath violator, and the commandment of the fringes (צִיצִת, tzitzit).

The parashah constitutes Numbers 13:1–15:41. It is made up of 5,820 Hebrew letters, 1,540 Hebrew words, 119 verses, and 198 lines in a Torah Scroll (Sefer Torah). Jews generally read it in June or early July.

== Readings ==
In traditional Sabbath Torah reading, the parashah is divided into seven readings, or עליות, aliyot.

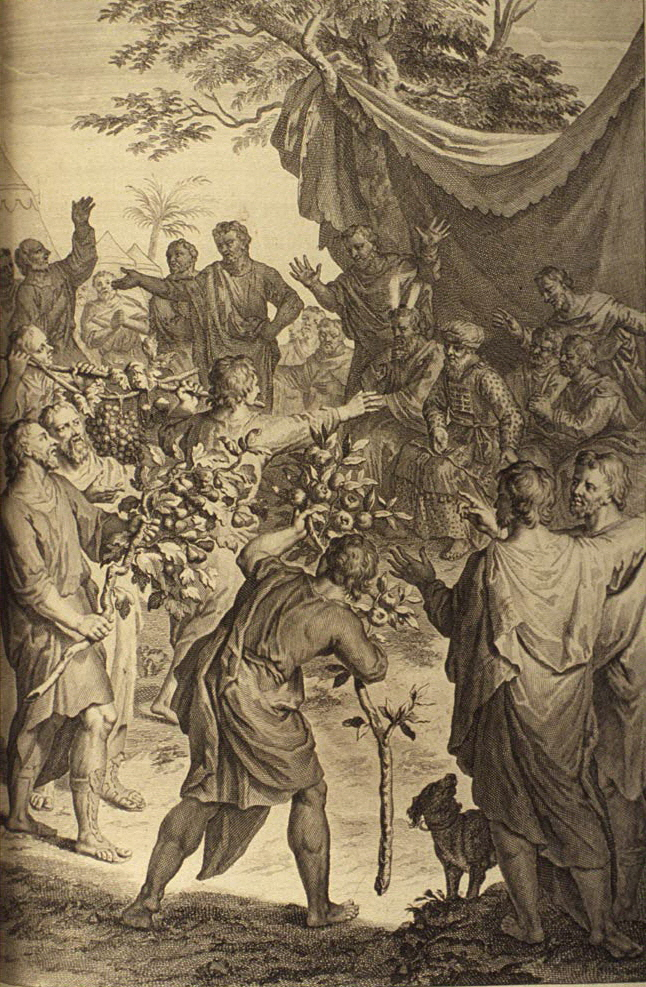
The Spies Showing the Fertility of Canaan (illustration from the 1728 Figures de la Bible)

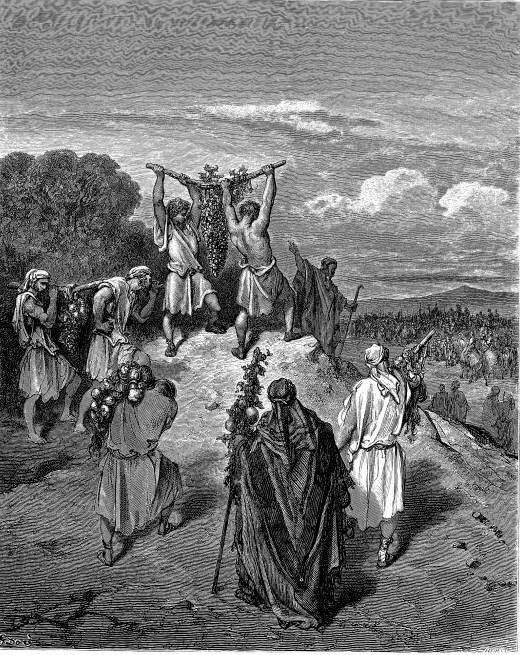
Return of the Spies from the Land of Promise (engraving by Gustave Doré)

=== First reading—Numbers 13:1–20 ===
In the first reading, God told Moses to send one chieftain from each of the 12 tribes of Israel to scout the land of Canaan, and Moses sent them out from the wilderness of Paran. Among the scouts were Caleb, son of Jephunneh from the Tribe of Judah and Hosea (Hoshea), son of Nun from the Tribe of Ephraim. Moses changed Hosea's name to Joshua. Moses asked for an assessment of the geographical features of the land, the strength and numbers of the population, the agricultural potential and actual performance of the land, civic organization (whether their cities were like camps or strongholds), and forestry conditions. He also asked them to be positive in their outlook and to return with samples of local produce.

=== Second reading—Numbers 13:21–14:7 ===
In the second reading, they scouted the land as far as Hebron. At the wadi Eshcol, they cut down a branch with a single cluster of grapes so large that it had to be borne on a carrying frame by two of them, as well as some pomegranates and figs. At the end of 40 days, they returned and reported to Moses, Aaron, and the whole Israelite community at Kadesh, saying that the land did indeed flow with milk and honey (date honey) but that the people who inhabited it were powerful, the cities were fortified and very large, and that they saw the Anakites there. Caleb hushed the people and urged them to go up and take the land. But the other scouts spread calumnies about the land, calling it "one that devours its settlers." They reported that the land's people were giants and stronger than the Israelites. The whole community broke into crying, railed against Moses and Aaron, and shouted: "If only we might die in this wilderness!" Moses and Aaron fell on their faces, and Joshua and Caleb rent their clothes.

=== Third reading—Numbers 14:8–25 ===
In the third reading, Joshua and Caleb exhorted the Israelites not to fear and not to rebel against God. Just as the community threatened to pelt them with stones, God's Presence appeared in the Tabernacle. God complained to Moses: "How long will this people spurn Me," and threatened to strike them with pestilence and make of Moses a nation more numerous than they. But Moses told God to think of what the Egyptians would think when they heard the news, and how they would think God powerless to bring the Israelites to the Promised Land. Moses asked God to forbear, quoting God's self-description as "slow to anger and abounding in kindness, forgiving iniquity and transgression." In response, God pardoned, but also swore that none of the men who had seen God's signs would see the Promised Land, except Caleb and Joshua.

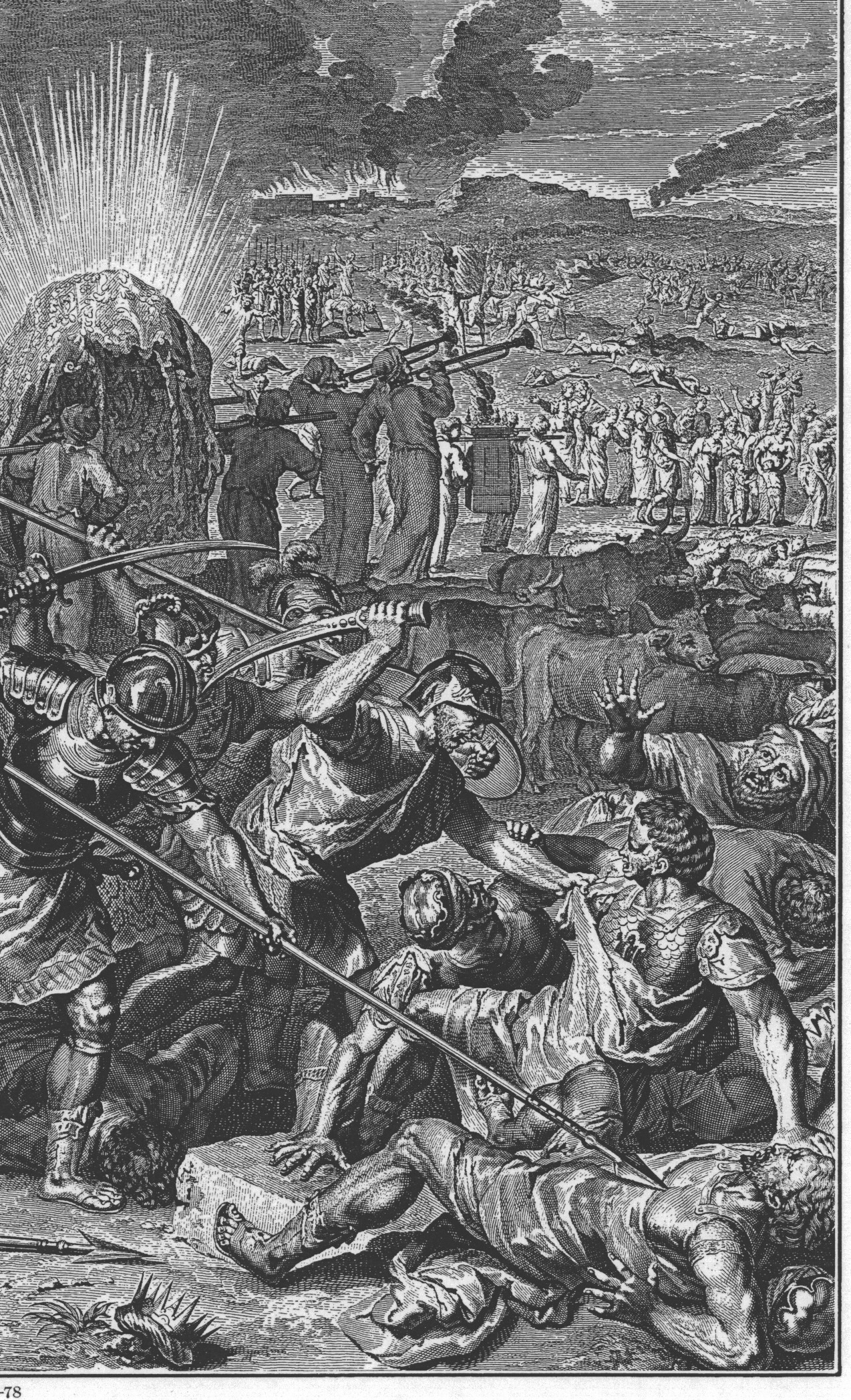
Israel Driven Back into the Desert (illustration by B. Barnards from the 1908 Bible and Its Story Taught by One Thousand Picture Lessons)

=== Fourth reading—Numbers 14:26–15:7 ===
In the fourth reading, God swore that all of the men 20 years old and up, except Caleb and Joshua, would die in the wilderness. God said that the Israelites' children would enter the Promised Land after roaming the wilderness, suffering for the faithlessness of the present generation, for 40 years, corresponding to the number of days that the scouts scouted the land. The scouts other than Caleb and Joshua died of plague. Early the next morning, the Israelites set out to the Promised Land, but Moses told them that they would not succeed without God in their midst. But they marched forward anyway, and the Amalekites and the Canaanites dealt them a shattering blow at Hormah. God told Moses to tell Israelites that when they entered the Promised Land and would present an offering to God, the person presenting the offering was also to bring flour mixed with oil and wine.

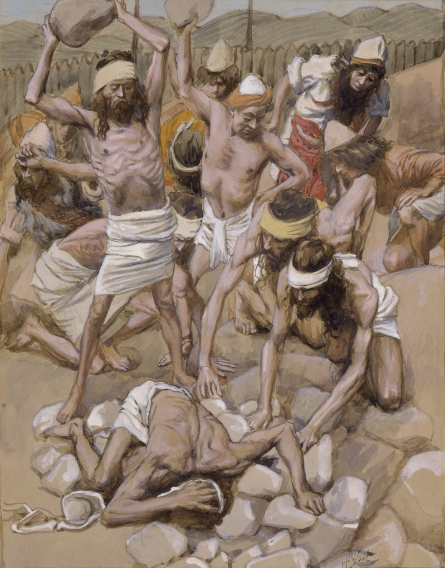
The Sabbath-Breaker Stoned (watercolor circa 1896–1902 by James Tissot)

=== Fifth reading—Numbers 15:8–16 ===
In the fifth reading, God told Moses to tell Israelites that when they would present a bull for a burnt offering to God, the person presenting the offering was also to bring flour mixed with oil and wine. And when a resident alien wanted to present an offering, the same law would apply.

=== Sixth reading—Numbers 15:17–26 ===
In the sixth reading, when the Israelites ate bread of the land, they were to set aside a portion, a dough offering (חַלָּה, challah), as a gift to God. If the community unwittingly failed to observe any commandment, the community was to present one bull as a burnt offering with its proper meal offering and wine, and one he-goat as a sin offering, and the priest would make expiation for the whole community and they would be forgiven.

=== Seventh reading—Numbers 15:27–41 ===
In the seventh reading, if an individual sinned unwittingly, the individual was to offer a she-goat in its first year as a sin offering, and the priest would make expiation that the individual might be forgiven. But the person who violated a commandment defiantly was to be cut off from among his people. Once the Israelites came upon a man gathering wood on the Sabbath day, and they brought him before Moses, Aaron, and the community and placed him in custody. God told Moses that the whole community was to stone him to death outside the camp, so they did so. God told Moses to instruct the Israelites to make for themselves fringes (צִיצִת, tzitzit) on each of the corners of their garments. They were to look at the fringes, recall the commandments, and observe them.

=== Readings according to the triennial cycle ===
Jews who read the Torah according to the triennial cycle of Torah reading read the parashah according to the following schedule:

| | Year 1 | Year 2 | Year 3 |
| | 2023, 2026, 2029 ... | 2024, 2027, 2030 ... | 2025, 2028, 2031 ... |
| Reading | 13:1–14:7 | 14:8–15:7 | 15:8–15:41 |
|---|---|---|---|
| 1 | 13:1–3 | 14:8–10 | 15:8–10 |
| 2 | 13:4–16 | 14:11–20 | 15:11–16 |
| 3 | 13:17–20 | 14:21–25 | 15:17–21 |
| 4 | 13:21–24 | 14:26–38 | 15:22–26 |
| 5 | 13:25–30 | 14:39–42 | 15:27–31 |
| 6 | 13:31–33 | 14:43–15:3 | 15:32–36 |
| 7 | 14:1–7 | 15:4–7 | 15:37–41 |
| Maftir | 14:5–7 | 15:4–7 | 15:37–41 |

== In ancient parallels ==
The parashah has parallels in these ancient sources:

=== Numbers chapter 13 ===
Numbers 13:22 and 28 refer to the "children of Anak" (יְלִדֵי הָעֲנָק, yelidei ha-anak), Numbers 13:33 refers to the "sons of Anak" (בְּנֵי עֲנָק, benei anak), and Deuteronomy 1:28, 2:10–11, 2:21, and 9:2 refer to the "Anakim" (עֲנָקִים). John A. Wilson suggested that the Anakim may be related to the Iy-‘anaq geographic region named in Middle Kingdom Egyptian (19th to 18th century BCE) pottery bowls that had been inscribed with the names of enemies and then shattered as a kind of curse.

Numbers 13:27 and 14:8, as well as Exodus 3:8 and 17, 13:5, and 33:3, Leviticus 20:24, and Deuteronomy 6:3, 11:9, 26:9 and 15, 27:3, and 31:20 describe the Land of Israel as a land flowing "with milk and honey." Similarly, the Middle Egyptian (early second millennium BCE) tale of Sinuhe Palestine described the Land of Israel or, as the Egyptian tale called it, the land of Yaa: "It was a good land called Yaa. Figs were in it and grapes. It had more wine than water. Abundant was its honey, plentiful its oil. All kind of fruit were on its trees. Barley was there and emmer, and no end of cattle of all kinds."

== In inner-biblical interpretation ==
The parashah has parallels or is discussed in these Biblical sources:

=== Numbers chapter 13 ===
Joshua 14:7–12 presents Caleb's recollection at age 85 of the incident of the scouts in Numbers 13–14.

=== Numbers chapter 14 ===
Benjamin Sommer read Exodus 34:6–7 and Numbers 14:18–20 to teach that God punishes children for their parents' sins as a sign of mercy to the parents: When sinning parents repent, God defers their punishment to their offspring. Sommer argued that other Biblical writers, engaging in inner-Biblical interpretation, rejected that notion in Deuteronomy 7:9–10, Jonah 4:2, and Psalm 103:8–10. Sommer argued that Psalm 103:8–10, for example, quoted Exodus 34:6–7, which was already an authoritative and holy text, but revised the morally troubling part: Where Exodus 34:7 taught that God punishes sin for generations, Psalm 103:9–10 maintained that God does not contend forever. Sommer argued that Deuteronomy 7:9–10 and Jonah 4:2 similarly quoted Exodus 34:6–7 with revision. Sommer asserted that Deuteronomy 7:9–10, Jonah 4:2, and Psalm 103:8–10 do not try to tell us how to read Exodus 34:6–7; that is, they do not argue that Exodus 34:6–7 somehow means something other than what it seems to say. Rather, they repeat Exodus 34:6–7 while also disagreeing with part of it.

=== Numbers chapter 15 ===
In Psalm 50, God clarifies the purpose of sacrifices, as discussed in Numbers 15:1–31. God states that correct sacrifice was not the taking of a bull out of the sacrificer's house, nor the taking of a goat out of the sacrificer's fold, to convey to God, for every animal was already God's possession. The sacrificer was not to think of the sacrifice as food for God, for God neither hungers nor eats. Rather, the worshiper was to offer to God the sacrifice of thanksgiving and call upon God in times of trouble, and thus God would deliver the worshiper and the worshiper would honor God.

Psalm 107 enumerates four occasions on which a thank offering (זִבְחֵי תוֹדָה, zivchei todah), as described in Leviticus 7:12–15 (referring to a זֶבַח תּוֹדַת, zevach todah) would be appropriate:

1. passage through the desert,
2. release from prison,
3. recovery from serious disease, and
4. surviving a storm at sea.

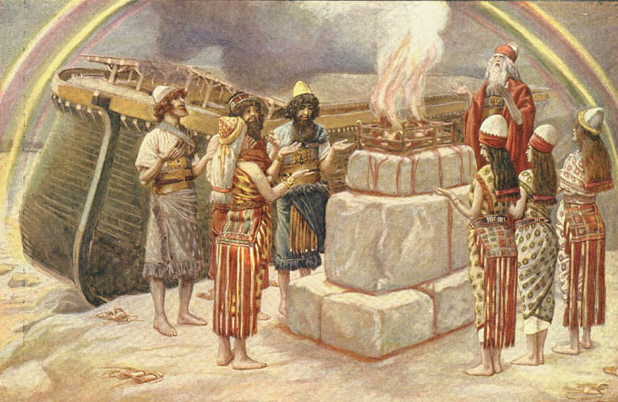
Noah's Sacrifice (watercolor circa 1896–1902 by James Tissot)

The Hebrew Bible reports several instances of sacrifices before God explicitly called for them in Leviticus 1–7. While Leviticus 1:3–17 and Leviticus 6:1–6 set out the procedure for the burnt offering (עֹלָה, olah), before then, Genesis 8:20 reports that Noah offered burnt-offerings (עֹלֹת, olot) of every clean beast and bird on an altar after the waters of the Flood subsided. The story of the Binding of Isaac includes three references to the burnt offering (עֹלָה, olah). In Genesis 22:2, God told Abraham to take Isaac and offer him as a burnt offering (עֹלָה, olah). Genesis 22:3 then reports that Abraham rose early in the morning and split the wood for the burnt offering (עֹלָה, olah). And after the angel of the Lord averted Isaac's sacrifice, Genesis 22:13 reports that Abraham lifted up his eyes and saw a ram caught in a thicket, and Abraham then offered the ram as a burnt offering (עֹלָה, olah) instead of his son. Exodus 10:25 reports that Moses pressed Pharaoh for Pharaoh to give the Israelites "sacrifices and burnt offerings" (זְבָחִים וְעֹלֹת, zevachim v'olot) to offer to God. And Exodus 18:12 reports that after Jethro heard all that God did to Pharaoh and the Egyptians, Jethro offered a burnt-offering and sacrifices (עֹלָה וּזְבָחִים, olah uzevachim) to God.

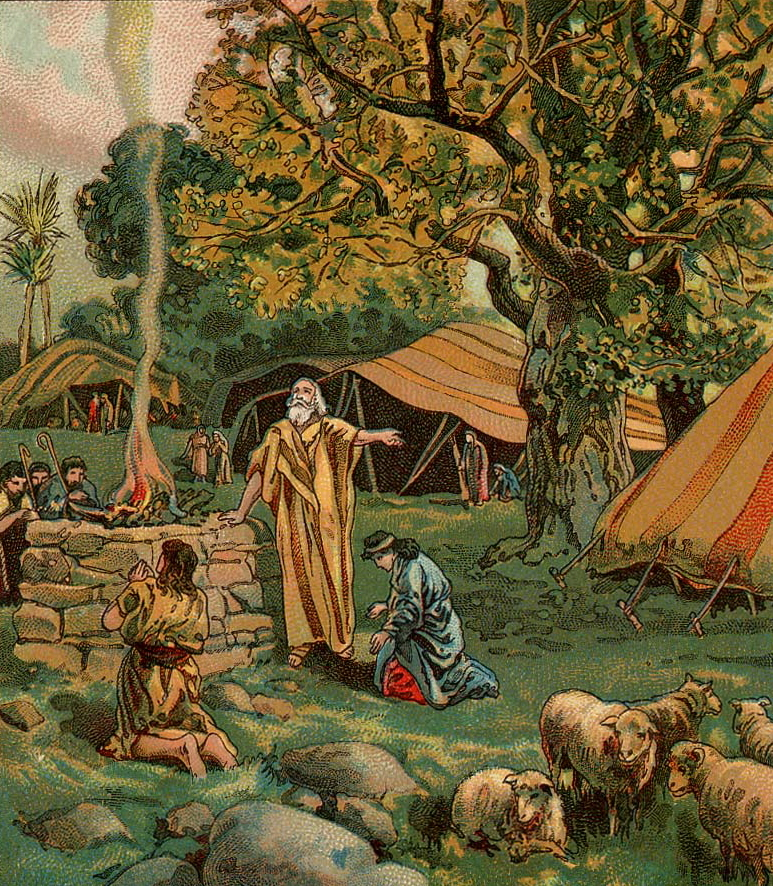
Abram Called To Be a Blessing (illustration from a Bible card published 1906 by the Providence Lithograph Company)

While Leviticus 2 and Leviticus 6:7–16 set out the procedure for the meal-offering (מִנְחָה, minchah), before then, in Genesis 4:3, Cain brought an offering (מִנְחָה, minchah) of the fruit of the ground. And then Genesis 4:4–5 reports that God had respect for Abel and his offering (מִנְחָתוֹ, minchato), but for Cain and his offering (מִנְחָתוֹ, minchato), God had no respect.

And while Numbers 15:4–9 indicates that one bringing an animal sacrifice needed also to bring a drink offering (נֶּסֶךְ, nesech), before then, in Genesis 35:14, Jacob poured out a drink offering (נֶּסֶךְ, nesech) at Bethel.

More generally, the Hebrew Bible addressed "sacrifices" (זְבָחִים, zevachim) generically in connection with Jacob and Moses. After Jacob and Laban reconciled, Genesis 31:54 reports that Jacob offered a sacrifice (זֶבַח, zevach) on the mountain and shared a meal with his kinsmen. And after Jacob learned that Joseph was still alive in Egypt, Genesis 46:1 reports that Jacob journeyed to Beersheba and offered sacrifices (זְבָחִים, zevachim) to the God of his father Isaac. And Moses and Aaron argued repeatedly with Pharaoh over their request to go three days' journey into the wilderness and sacrifice (וְנִזְבְּחָה, venizbechah) to God.

The Hebrew Bible also includes several ambiguous reports in which Abraham or Isaac built or returned to an altar and "called upon the name of the Lord." In these cases, the text implies but does not explicitly state that the Patriarch offered a sacrifice. And at God's request, Abraham conducted an unusual sacrifice at the Covenant between the Pieces in Genesis 15:9–21.

The consistent application of the law regarding sacrifices to both Israelites and the strangers dwelling amongst them (Numbers 15:16|}}) reflects the same principle in the Passover regulations in the Book of Exodus (Exodus 12:49|}}).

The ordinances for seeking forgiveness of unintentional sin (Numbers 15:22–29) are a shorter form of the ordinances set out in more detail ordinances in Leviticus 4.

The requirement to wait because God had not yet revealed how violators of the Sabbath should be treated (Numbers 15:34|}}) is similar to the requirement in Numbers 9:8|}}, where Moses commanded the community to wait until he heard the law concerning the Second Passover.

== In early nonrabbinic interpretation ==
The parashah has parallels or is discussed in these early nonrabbinic sources:

=== Numbers chapter 15 ===
Pseudo-Philo read the commandment to wear tzitzit in Numbers 15:37–40 together with the story of Korah’s rebellion that follows immediately after in Numbers 16:1–3. Pseudo-Philo reported that God commanded Moses about the tassels, and then Korah and the 200 men with him rebelled, asking why that unbearable law had been imposed on them.

== In classical rabbinic interpretation ==
The parashah is discussed in these rabbinic sources from the era of the Mishnah and the Talmud:

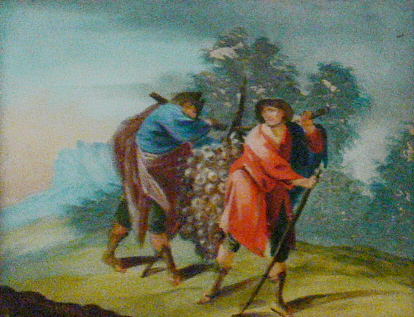
Joshua and Caleb

=== Numbers chapter 13 ===
Resh Lakish interpreted the words "Send you men" in Numbers 13:2 to indicate that God gave Moses discretion over whether to send the spies. Resh Lakish read Moses' recollection of the matter in Deuteronomy 1:23 that "the thing pleased me well" to mean that agreeing to send the spies pleased Moses well but not God.

Reading Numbers 13:2, "Send you men," a midrash contrasted the two righteous men Phinehas and Caleb, the spies whom Joshua sent in Joshua 2:1, who risked their lives in order to perform their mission, with the messengers whom Moses sent, who the midrash taught were wicked men.

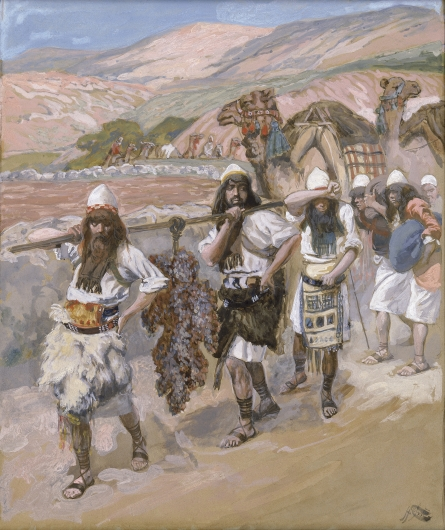
The Grapes of Canaan (watercolor circa 1896–1902 by James Tissot)

A midrash read Numbers 13:2, "Send you men," together with Proverbs 10:26, "As vinegar to the teeth, and as smoke to the eyes, so is the sluggard to them that send him." The midrash taught that God could see from the first that the spies were going to slander the land, as Jeremiah 9:2 says, "And they bend their tongue, their bow of falsehood." The midrash compared God's words in Numbers 13:2 to the case of a rich man who had a vineyard. Whenever he saw that the wine was good, he would direct his men to bring the wine into his house, but when he saw that the wine had turned to vinegar, he would tell his men to take the wine into their houses. Similarly, when God saw the elders and how worthy they were, God called them God's own, as God says in Numbers 11:16, "Gather to Me 70 men," but when God saw the spies and how they would later sin, God ascribed them to Moses, saying in Numbers 13:2, "Send you men."

A midrash contrasted Numbers 13:2, "Send you men," with Proverbs 26:6, "He that sends a message by the hand of a fool cuts off his own feet, and drinks damage." The midrash asked whether the spies were men or fools. The midrash noted that Numbers 13:2 says, "Send you men," and wherever Scripture uses the word "men," Scripture implies righteous people, as in Exodus 17:9, "And Moses said to Joshua: 'Choose us out men'"; in 1 Samuel 17:12, "And the man was an old man (and thus wise) in the days of Saul, coming among men (who would naturally be like him)"; and in 1 Samuel 1:11, "But will give to Your handmaid seed who are men." If Numbers 13:2 thus implies that the spies were righteous people, could they still have been fools? The midrash explained that they were fools because they spread an evil report about the land, and Proverbs 10:18 says, "He that utters a slander is a fool." The midrash reconciled the two characterizations by saying that the spies were great men who then made fools of themselves. It was concerning them that Moses said in Deuteronomy 32:20, "They are a very contrary generation, children in whom is no faithfulness." For the midrash taught that the spies had been chosen out of all Israel by the command of both God and Moses; as Moses said in Deuteronomy 1:23, "And the thing pleased me well; and I took twelve men of you," implying that they were righteous in the opinion of both Israel and in Moses. Yet Moses did not want to send them on his own responsibility, so he consulted God about each individual, mentioning the name and tribe of each, and God told Moses that each was worthy. The midrash explained that one can infer that God told Moses that they were worthy, because Numbers 13:3 reports, "And Moses sent them from the wilderness of Paran according to the commandment of the Lord." Afterwards, at the end of 40 days, they changed and made all the trouble, causing that generation to be punished; thus Deuteronomy 32:20 says, "For they are a very contrary (tahpukot) generation," since when they were selected they were righteous and then they changed (nitapeku). Accordingly, Numbers 13:2 says, "Send you men," and afterwards Numbers 13:16 says, "These are the names of the men."

Rabbi Akiva read the words of Numbers 13:2, "one man, one man per tribe," to indicate that there two spies for each tribe, or 24 spies in total, of whom 16 spies carried the cluster of grapes and eight spies carried the figs, pomegranates, and their belongings. Rabbi Simeon (or others say Rabbi Ishmael), however, said that doubled expressions like this are simply a manner of speaking, and that there was only one spy per tribe, or 12 spies in total, of whom eight spies carried the cluster of grapes and four spies carried the figs, pomegranates, and their belongings. In Rabbi Akiva's view, the spies used twice as many poles to hold the cluster of grapes as the spies used in Rabbi Ishmael's view.

A midrash taught that one should become an explorer for wisdom, as Numbers 13:2 uses the term. Reading Ecclesiastes 1:13, "And I applied my heart to seek and to search out by wisdom," the midrash asked what it means "to search out (la-tur) by wisdom." The midrash explained that it means to search for wisdom, to become an explorer of wisdom, as the word is employed in Numbers 13:2, "Send you men, that they may spy out (yaturu) the land of Canaan." Thus Ecclesiastes 1:13 teaches that one should sit in the presence of one who teaches Scripture well or expounds Mishnah well and become a scout to discover knowledge.

Rabbi Isaac said that the spies' names betrayed their lack of faith, and that Sethur's name (in Numbers 13:13) meant that he undermined (sathar) the works of God. And Rabbi Joḥanan said that the name of Nahbi the son of Vophsi (in Numbers 13:14) meant that he hid (hikbi) God's words.

The Avot of Rabbi Natan found a reference to the episode of the spies in the listing of places in Deuteronomy 1:1, which the Avot of Rabbi Natan read to allude to how God tested the Israelites with ten trials in the Wilderness, all of which they failed. According to the Avot of Rabbi Natan, in Deuteronomy 1:1, the words "In the wilderness" allude to the Golden Calf, as Exodus 32:8 reports. "On the plain" alludes to how they complained about not having water, as Exodus 17:3 reports. "Facing Suf" alludes to how they rebelled at the Sea of Reeds (or some say to the idol that Micah made). Rabbi Judah cited Psalm 106:7, "They rebelled at the Sea of Reeds." "Between Paran" alludes to the Twelve Spies, as Numbers 13:3 says, "Moses sent them from the wilderness of Paran." "And Tophel" alludes to the frivolous words (תפלות, tiphlot) they said about the manna. "Lavan" alludes to Koraḥ's mutiny. "Ḥatzerot" alludes to the quails. And in Deuteronomy 9:22, it says, "At Tav'erah, and at Masah, and at Kivrot HaTa'avah." And "Di-zahav" alludes to when Aaron said to them: "Enough (דַּי, dai) of this golden (זָהָב, zahav) sin that you have committed with the Calf!" But Rabbi Eliezer ben Ya'akov said it means "Terrible enough (דַּי, dai) is this sin that Israel was punished to last from now until the resurrection of the dead."

Rava noted that Numbers 13:22 literally reads "they went up into the South, and he came to Hebron," and deduced from the change in the number of the pronoun that Caleb separated himself from the spies' plan and prostrated himself in prayer on the graves of the patriarchs in Hebron.

Interpreting the names Ahiman, Sheshai, and Talmai in Numbers 13:22, a baraita taught that Ahiman was the most skillful of the brothers, Sheshai turned the ground on which he stepped into pits, and Talmai turned the ground into ridges when he walked. It was also taught that Ahiman built Anath, Sheshai built Alush, and Talmai built Talbush. They were called "the children of Anak" (the giant) because they seemed so tall that they would reach the sun.

Ham
Cush | Mizraim | Put | Canaan

A baraita interpreted the words "and Hebron was built seven years before Zoan in Egypt" in Numbers 13:22 to mean that Hebron was seven times as fertile as Zoan. The baraita rejected the plain meaning of "built," reasoning that Ham would not build a house for his younger son Canaan (in whose land was Hebron) before he built one for his elder son Mizraim (in whose land was Zoan), and Genesis 10:6 lists (presumably in order of birth) "the sons of Ham: Cush, and Mizraim, and Put, and Canaan." The baraita also taught that among all the nations, there was none more fertile than Egypt, for Genesis 13:10 says, "Like the garden of the Lord, like the land of Egypt." And there was no more fertile spot in Egypt than Zoan, where kings lived, for Isaiah 30:4 says of Pharaoh, "his princes are at Zoan." And in all of Israel, there was no more rocky ground than that at Hebron, which is why the Patriarchs buried their dead there, as reported in Genesis 49:31. But rocky Hebron was still seven times as fertile as lush Zoan.

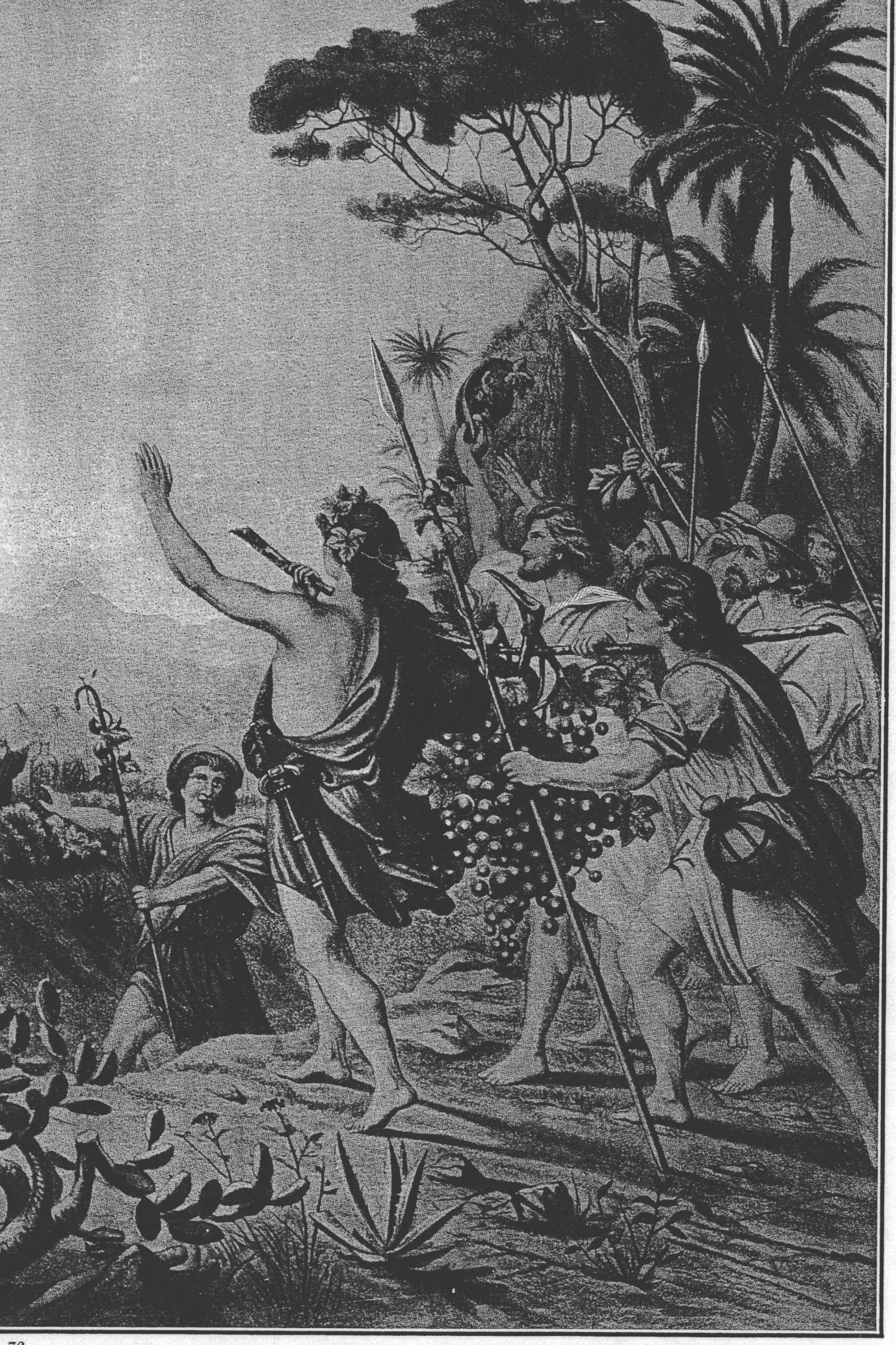
The Spies Return (illustration by Wilhelm Ebbinghaus from the 1908 Bible and Its Story Taught by One Thousand Picture Lessons)

The Gemara interpreted the words "between two" in Numbers 13:23 to teach that the scouts carried the large cluster of grapes on two staffs. Rabbi Isaac said that the scouts carried the grapes with a series of balancing poles. The Gemara explained that eight spies carried the grape-cluster, one carried a pomegranate, one carried a fig, and Joshua and Caleb did not carry anything, either because they were the most distinguished of them, or because they did not share in the plan to discourage the Israelites.

The Jerusalem Talmud taught that the bunch of grapes must have been much heavier than the stones that Joshua 4:5 reports that the Israelites took from the Jordan River, as there Joshua instructed each man to lift a stone onto his shoulder.

Rabbi Joḥanan said in the name of Rabbi Simeon ben Yohai that the words "And they went and came to Moses" in Numbers 13:26 equated the going with the coming back, indicating that just as they came back with an evil design, they had set out with an evil design.

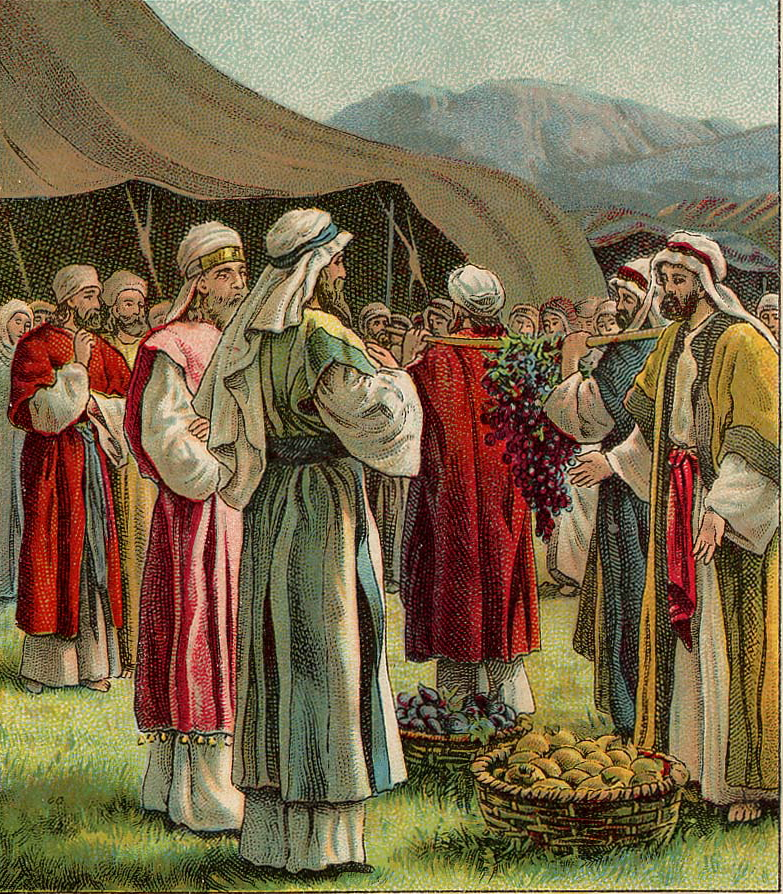
The Two Reports of the Spies (illustration from Bible card published 1907 by Providence Lithograph Company)

The Gemara reported a number of Rabbis' reports of how the Land of Israel did indeed flow with "milk and honey," as described in Exodus 3:8 and 17, 13:5, and 33:3, Leviticus 20:24, Numbers 13:27 and 14:8, and Deuteronomy 6:3, 11:9, 26:9 and 15, 27:3, and 31:20. Once when Rami bar Ezekiel visited Bnei Brak, he saw goats grazing under fig trees while honey was flowing from the figs, and milk dripped from the goats mingling with the fig honey, causing him to remark that it was indeed a land flowing with milk and honey. Rabbi Jacob ben Dostai said that it is about three miles from Lod to Ono, and once he rose up early in the morning and waded all that way up to his ankles in fig honey. Resh Lakish said that he saw the flow of the milk and honey of Sepphoris extend over an area of sixteen miles by sixteen miles. Rabbah bar Bar Hana said that he saw the flow of the milk and honey in all the Land of Israel and the total area was equal to an area of twenty-two parasangs by six parasangs.

Rabbi Joḥanan said in the name of Rabbi Meir that the spies began with a true report in Numbers 13:27 and then spoke ill in Numbers 13:28, because any piece of slander needs some truth in the beginning to be heard through to the end.

Rabbah interpreted Numbers 13:30 to report that Caleb won the people over with his words, for he saw that when Joshua began to address them, they disparaged Joshua for failing to have children. So Caleb took a different tack and asked, "Is this all that Amram's son [Moses] has done to us?" And as they thought that Caleb was about to disparage Moses, they fell silent. Then Caleb said, "He brought us out of Egypt, divided the sea, and fed us manna. If he were to ask us to get ladders and climb to heaven, should we not obey? And then Caleb said the words reported in Numbers 13:30, "We should go up at once, and possess the land, for we are well able to overcome it."

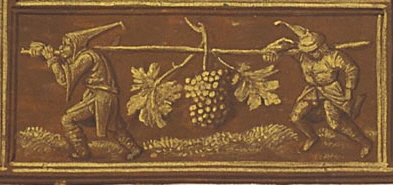
The Spies Return from Canaan Carrying a Large Bunch of Grapes (miniature on vellum by a follower of Simon Bening from a 1500–1525 Southern Netherlands Book of Hours)

Reading Psalm 76:6, "The stout-hearted are bereft of sense, they sleep their sleep," a midrash taught that the expression "bereft of sense" applied to Moses and Aaron. They sent the spies, who slandered the land, so that they did not know what to do. Moses and Aaron lost courage, but Caleb immediately rose and silenced all of the people, as Numbers 13:30 reports, "And Caleb stilled (vayahas) the people." He stood on a bench and silenced them, saying, "Silence (has)!" and they became silent to hear him. Caleb told them in Numbers 14:7, "The land . . . is an exceeding good land." God therefore said to Moses, "I am exceedingly grateful to him [Caleb]," as may be inferred from Deuteronomy 1:36, "Except (zulati) Caleb the son of Jephunneh, he shall see it . . . because he has wholly followed the Lord.” The word zulati signified lazeh itti, “this one was with Me,” more than the 600,000 other Israelites, who could not find your hands and feet, but failed in courage. Thus Psalm 76:6 says, “The stout-hearted are bereft of sense.” The midrash taught that it came to this because the messengers that Moses and Aaron sent were fools. Of such as these Proverbs 26:6 observes, “He that sends a message by the hand of a fool cuts off his own feet, and drinks damage.”

Rabbi Hanina bar Papa read the spies to say in Numbers 13:31 not "they are stronger than we" but "they are stronger than He," questioning God's power.

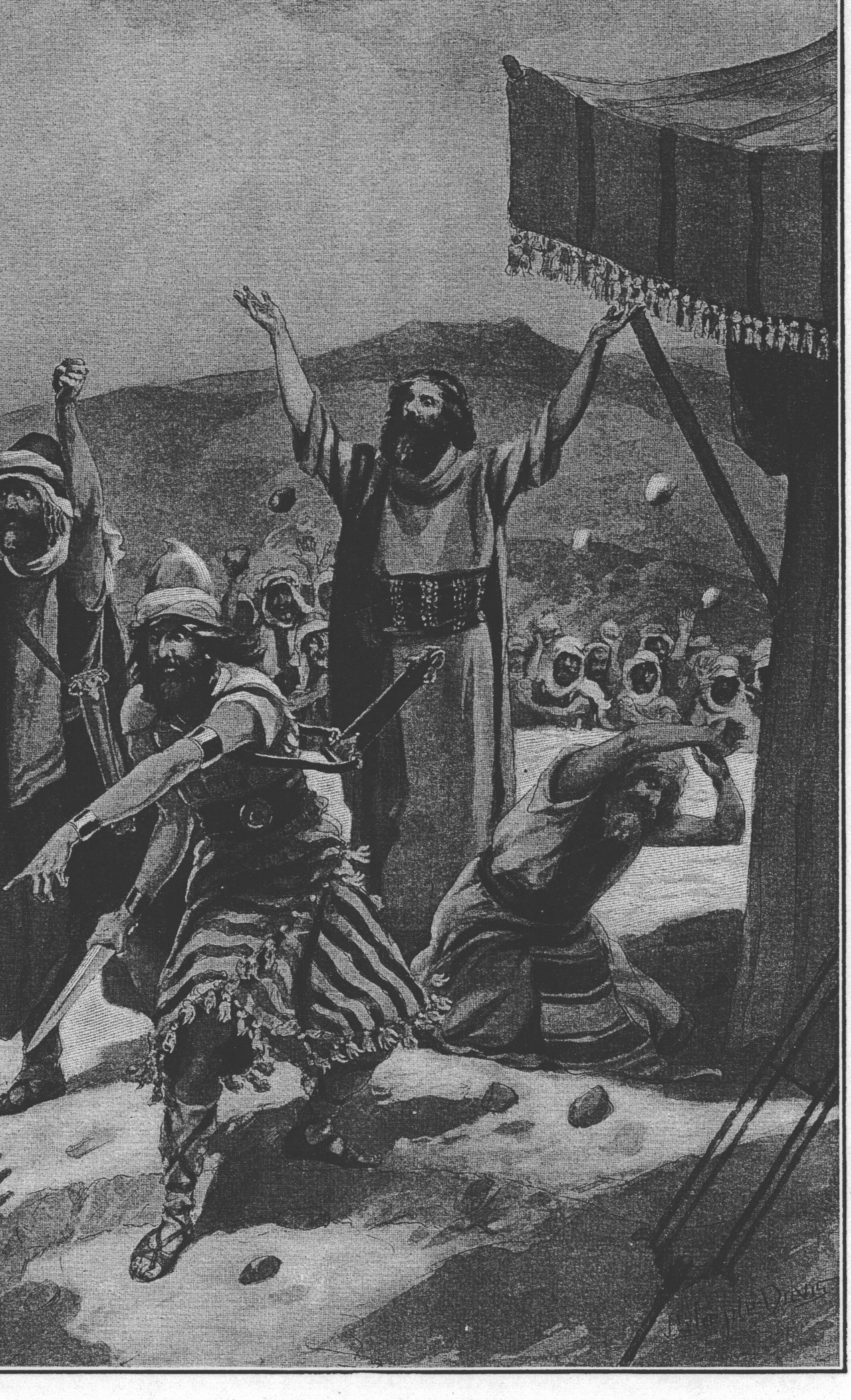
Joshua Saved (illustration by John Steeple Davis from the 1908 Bible and Its Story Taught by One Thousand Picture Lessons)

The Mishnah noted that the evil report of the scouts in Numbers 13:32 caused God to seal the decree against the Israelites in the wilderness in Numbers 14:22–23. The Mishnah thus deduced that one who speaks suffers more than one who acts.

Rav Mesharsheya said that Numbers 13:33 proved that the spies were liars, for though they might well have known that they saw themselves as grasshoppers, they had no way of knowing how the inhabitants of the land saw them.

=== Numbers chapter 14 ===
The Pirke De-Rabbi Eliezer told that God spoke to the Torah the words of Genesis 1:26, "Let us make man in our image, after our likeness." The Torah answered that the man whom God sought to create would be limited in days and full of anger and would come into the power of sin. Unless God would be long-suffering with him, the Torah continued, it would be well for man not to come into the world. God asked the Torah whether it was for nothing that God is called (echoing Numbers 14:18) "slow to anger" and "abounding in love." God then began to collect the dust from the four corners of the world—red, black, and white—and made the first human.

The Pirke De-Rabbi Eliezer said that God had spoken the words of Numbers 14:20 to Moses before, after the incident of the Golden Calf. The Pirke De-Rabbi Eliezer told that after the incident of the Golden Calf, Moses foretold that he would behold God's Glory and make atonement for the Israelites' iniquities on Yom Kippur. On that day, Moses asked God to pardon the iniquities of the people in connection with the Golden Calf. God told Moses that if he had asked God then to pardon the iniquities of all Israel, even to the end of all generations, God would have done so, as it was the appropriate time. But Moses had asked for pardon with reference to the Golden Calf, so God told Moses that it would be according to his words, as Numbers 14:20 says, "And the Lord said, 'I have pardoned according to your word.'"

A baraita taught that when Moses ascended to receive the Torah from God, Moses found God writing "longsuffering" among the words with which Exodus 34:8 describes God. Moses asked God whether God meant longsuffering with the righteous, to which God replied that God is longsuffering even with the wicked. Moses exclaimed that God could let the wicked perish, but God cautioned Moses that Moses would come to desire God's longsuffering for the wicked. Later, when the Israelites sinned at the incident of the spies, God reminded Moses that he had suggested that God be longsuffering only with the righteous, to which Moses recounted that God had promised to be longsuffering even with the wicked. And that is why Moses in Numbers 14:17–18 cited to God that God is "slow to anger."

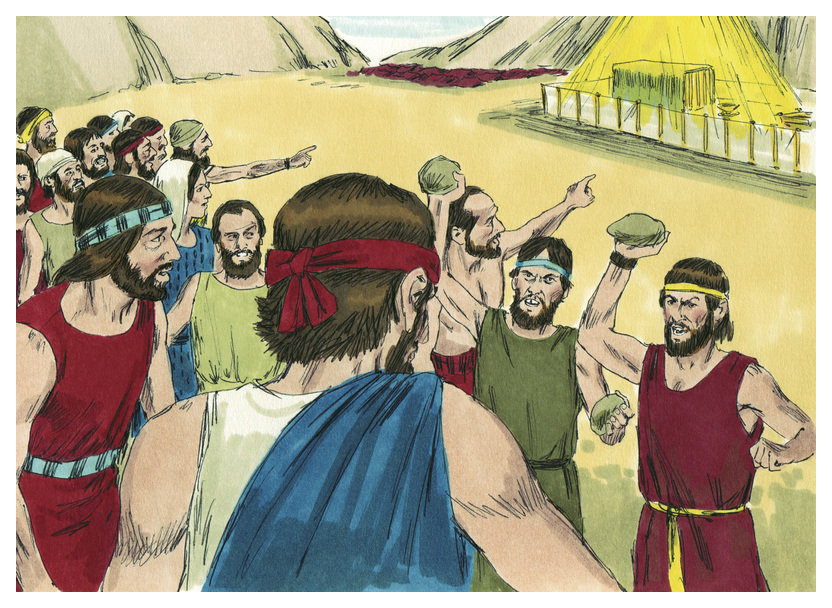
The People Were About To Stone the Two Spies When the Light of God Appeared over the Tabernacle (1984 illustration by Jim Padgett, courtesy of Sweet Publishing)

Rabbi Simeon son of Rabbi Ishmael interpreted the term "the Tabernacle of the testimony" in Exodus 38:21 to mean that the Tabernacle was God's testimony to the whole world that God had in Numbers 14:20 forgiven Israel for having made the Golden Calf. Rabbi Isaac explained with a parable. A king took a wife whom he dearly loved. He became angry with her and left her, and her neighbors taunted her, saying that he would not return. Then the king sent her a message asking her to prepare the king's palace and make the beds therein, for he was coming back to her on such-and-such a day. On that day, the king returned to her and became reconciled to her, entering her chamber and eating and drinking with her. Her neighbors at first did not believe it, but when they smelled the fragrant spices, they knew that the king had returned. Similarly, God loved Israel, bringing the Israelites to Mount Sinai, and giving them the Torah, but after only 40 days, they sinned with the Golden Calf. The heathen nations then said that God would not be reconciled with the Israelites. But when Moses pleaded for mercy on their behalf, God forgave them, as Numbers 14:20 reports, "And the Lord said: ‘I have pardoned according to your word.'" Moses then told God that even though he personally was quite satisfied that God had forgiven Israel, he asked that God might announce that fact to the nations. God replied that God would cause God's Shechinah to dwell in their midst, and thus Exodus 25:8 says, "And let them make Me a sanctuary, that I may dwell among them." And by that sign, God intended that all nations might know that God had forgiven the Israelites. And thus Exodus 38:21 calls it "the Tabernacle of the testimony," because the Tabernacle was a testimony that God had pardoned the Israelites' sins.

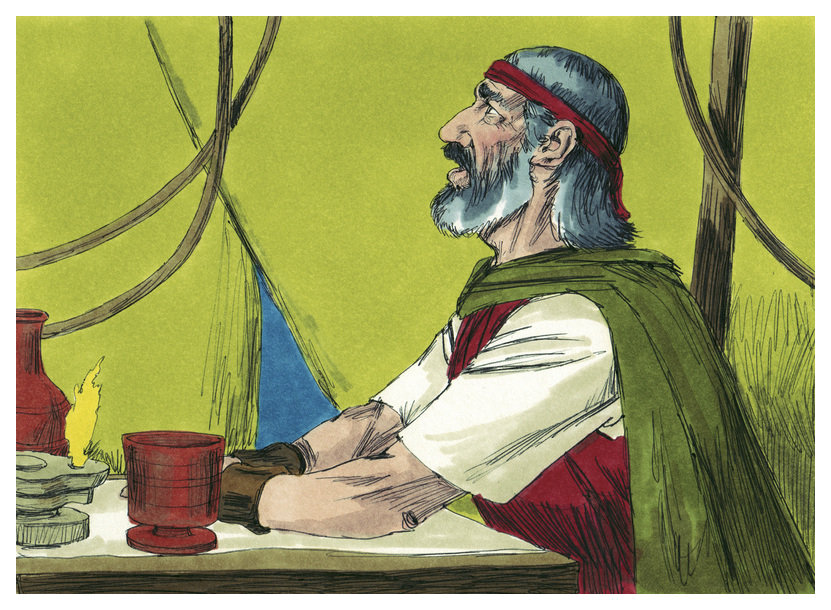
Moses Prayed and God Changed His Mind (1984 illustration by Jim Padgett, courtesy of Sweet Publishing)

The Mishnah deduced from Numbers 14:22 that the Israelites in the wilderness inflicted ten trials on God, one of which was the incident of the spies. And the Mishnah deduced further from Numbers 14:22 that those who speak ill suffer more than those who commit physical acts, and thus that God sealed the judgment against the Israelites in the wilderness only because of their evil words at the incident of the spies.

Reading Numbers 14:26, a midrash taught that in 18 verses, Scripture places Moses and Aaron (the instruments of Israel's deliverance) on an equal footing (reporting that God spoke to both of them alike), and thus there are 18 benedictions in the Amidah.

Because with regard to the ten spies in Numbers 14:27, God asked, "How long shall I bear with this evil congregation?" the Mishnah deduced that a "congregation" consists of no fewer than ten people. Expounding on the same word "congregation," Rabbi Halafta of Kefar Hanania deduced from the words "God stands in the congregation of God" in Psalm 82:1 that the Shechinah abides among ten who sit together and study Torah.

Similarly, the Jerusalem Talmud read the reference to "congregation" in Numbers 14:27 to support the proposition that ten comprise a congregation. Rabbi Abba and Rabbi Yasa said in the name of Rabbi Joḥanan that Scripture uses the word "congregation" in Numbers 35:24–25, "The congregation shall judge, and the congregation shall rescue," and also in Numbers 14:27, "How long shall this wicked congregation murmur against me?" and argued that just as the word "congregation" in Numbers 14:27 refers to ten persons (the twelve spies minus Joshua and Caleb), the word "congregation" in Numbers 35:24–25, must refer to ten persons, and thus judgments needed to take place in the presence of ten.

Similarly, the Gemara cited Numbers 14:27 to support the proposition that we need ten people in expressions of sanctity. Rabbi Ḥiyya bar Abba said that Rabbi Joḥanan said that God's words in Leviticus 22:32, "I shall be hallowed among the children of Israel," indicate that any expression of sanctity requires at least ten people. Rabbi Ḥiyya taught that this can be inferred by means of a verbal analogy (gezera shava) between two places that use the word "among." Leviticus 22:32 says, "And I shall be hallowed among the children of Israel," and Numbers 16:21, speaking about Korah's congregation, says, "Separate yourselves from among this congregation." Just as regarding Korah the reference was to ten, so too, with regard to hallowing the name of God, the reference is to a quorum of ten. The connotation of ten associated with the word "among" in the portion of Korah was, in turn, inferred by means of another verbal analogy between the word “congregation” written there and the word "congregation" written about the ten spies who slandered the Land of Israel, as Numbers 14:27 says, "How long shall I bear with this evil congregation?" In the case of the spies, it was a congregation of ten people, as there were twelve spies altogether, and Joshua and Caleb were not included in the evil congregation. So, the Gemara reasoned, in the case of Korah, the reference must also be to a congregation of ten people.

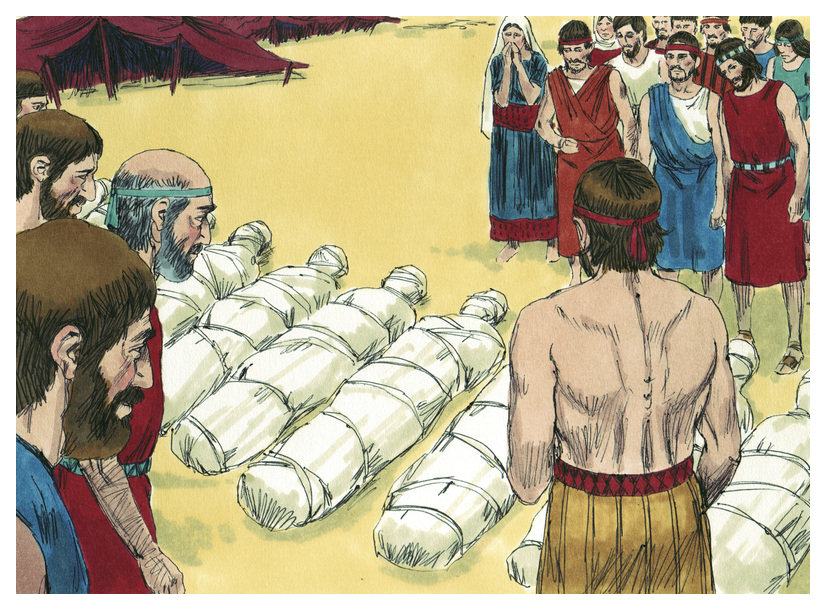
The Ten Spies Who Had Spread the False Report Died (1984 illustration by Jim Padgett, courtesy of Sweet Publishing)

Noting that in the incident of the spies, God did not punish those below the age of 20 (see Numbers 14:29), whom Deuteronomy 1:39 described as "children that . . . have no knowledge of good or evil," Rabbi Samuel bar Naḥmani taught in Rabbi Jonathan's name that God does not punish for the actions people take in their first 20 years.

Rav Hamnuna taught that God's decree that the generation of the spies would die in the wilderness did not apply to the Levites, for Numbers 14:29 says, "your carcasses shall fall in this wilderness, and all that were numbered of you, according to your whole number, from 20 years old and upward," and this implies that those who were numbered from 20 years old and upward came under the decree, while the tribe of Levi—which Numbers 4:3, 23, 30, 35, 39, 43, and 47 say was numbered from 30 years old and upward—was excluded from the decree.

A baraita taught that because of God's displeasure with the Israelites, the north wind did not blow on them in any of the 40 years during which they wandered in the wilderness. The Tosafot attributed God's displeasure to the incident of the spies, although Rashi attributed it to the Golden Calf.

Rabbi Akiva interpreted Numbers 14:35 to teach that the generation of the wilderness have no share in the World To Come and will not stand at the last judgment. Rabbi Eliezer said that it was concerning them that Psalm 50:5 said, "Gather my saints together to me; those who have made a covenant with me by sacrifice."

A midrash noted that Numbers 14:36 says that in the incident of the spies, "the men ... when they returned, made all the congregation to murmur against him." The midrash explained that that is why the report of Numbers 27:1–11 about the daughters of Zelophehad follows immediately after the report of Numbers 26:65 about the death of the wilderness generation. The midrash noted that Numbers 26:65 says, "there was not left a man of them, save Caleb the son of Jephunneh," because the men had been unwilling to enter the Land. But the midrash taught that Numbers 27:1 says, "then drew near the daughters of Zelophehad," to show that the women still sought an inheritance in the Land. The midrash taught that in that generation, the women built up fences that the men broke down.

The Mishnah deduced from Numbers 14:37 that the spies have no portion in the World To Come, as the words "those men ... died" in Numbers 14:37 indicated that they died in this world, and the words "by the plague" indicated that they died in the World To Come.

Rabbah in the name of Resh Lakish deduced from Numbers 14:37 that the spies who brought an evil report against the land died by the plague, and died because of the evil report that they had brought.

=== Numbers chapter 15 ===
The Mishnah exempted the meal offering that accompanied the drink offering in Numbers 15:4–5 from the penalty associated with eating piggul, offerings invalidated for improper intent. And the Mishnah ruled that these meal-offerings required oil but not frankincense.

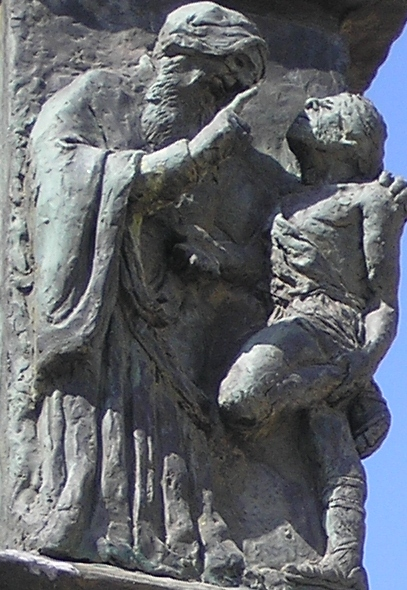
Hillel (detail from the Knesset Menorah in Jerusalem)

The Mishnah told that when Hillel the Elder observed that the nation withheld from lending to each other and were transgressing Deuteronomy 15:9, "Beware lest there be in your mind a base thought," he instituted the prozbul, a court exemption from the Sabbatical year cancellation of a loan. The Mishnah taught that any loan made with a prozbul is not canceled by the Sabbatical year. The Mishnah recounted that a prozbul would provide: "I turn over to you, so-and-so, judges of such and such a place, that any debt that I may have outstanding, I shall collect it whenever I desire." And the judges or witnesses would sign below.

Tractate Challah in the Mishnah, Tosefta, and Jerusalem Talmud interpreted the laws of separating a portion of bread, a dough offering (חַלָּה, challah), for the priests in Numbers 15:17–21.

The Mishnah taught that five types of grain are subject to the law of challah: wheat, barley, spelt, oats, and rye. Quantities of dough made from these different grains are counted together. They were also subject to the prohibition of the consumption of new produce before the waiving of the first sheaf, and to the prohibition of reaping prior to Passover. If they took root prior to the waiving of the first sheaf, the waiving of the first sheaf released them for consumption. But if not, they were prohibited until the next waiving of the first sheaf. The Mishnah taught that rice, millet, poppy seed, sesame, and legumes are exempt from challah (for though they are sometimes made into dough, they are not capable of leavening), as are less than five-fourths of a kav, or about 3½ pounds (the minimum subject to challah) of the five kinds of grain subject to challah. Sponge-biscuits, honey cakes, dumplings, pancakes, and dough made from a mixture of consecrated and unconsecrated grain are also exempt from challah.

The Mishnah taught that the minimum measure of challah is one twenty-fourth part of the dough (or in the case if the minimum amount subject to challah, about 2¼ ounces). If one makes dough for oneself or for a wedding banquet, the minimum is still one twenty-fourth (and no distinction is made based on volume of dough intended for private consumption). If one makes dough to sell in the market, the minimum is one forty-eighth. If dough is rendered unclean either unwittingly or by force of unavoidable circumstances, it is one forty-eighth, but if it was rendered unclean deliberately, it is one twenty-fourth, so that one who sins shall not profit from sin. The Mishnah taught that one cannot designate all of one's dough as challah, but must leave some that is not challah.

The School of Rabbi Ishmael taught that whenever Scripture uses the word "command (צַו, tzav)" (as Numbers 15:23 does), it denotes exhortation to obedience immediately and for all time. A baraita deduced exhortation to immediate obedience from the use of the word "command" in Deuteronomy 3:28, which says, "charge Joshua, and encourage him, and strengthen him." And the baraita deduced exhortation to obedience for all time from the use of the word "command" in Numbers 15:23, which says, "even all that the Lord has commanded you by the hand of Moses, from the day that the Lord gave the commandment, and onward throughout your generations."

A baraita taught that Rabbi Eliezer, the son of Rabbi Jose, said that he refuted the sectarian books that maintained that resurrection is not deducible from the Torah. To support the proposition that the Torah does refer to the resurrection of the dead, Rabbi Eliezer cited Numbers 15:31, which says, "Because he has despised the word of the Lord, and has broken his commandment, that soul shall utterly be cut off (הִכָּרֵת תִּכָּרֵת, hikareit tikareit); his iniquity shall be upon him." Rabbi Eliezer reasoned that as this person would be utterly cut off in this world (meaning that he would die), the person's iniquity would need to be upon him in the next world (in the life after death). Rav Papa asked Abaye whether Rabbi Eliezer could not have deduced both this world and the next from the words "he shall be utterly cut off." The answer was that they would have replied that the Torah employed human phraseology. Similarly, the Tannaim disputed: Rabbi Akiva taught that the words, "That soul shall utterly be cut off (הִכָּרֵת, hikareit)," mean that he shall be cut off in this world and (תִּכָּרֵת, tikareit) in the next. Rabbi Ishmael noted that Numbers 15:30 previously stated, "he reproaches the Lord, and that soul shall be cut off," and asked whether Rabbi Akiva's reasoning thus implied the existence of three words. Rather, Rabbi Ishmael taught that the words of Numbers 15:30, "and [that soul] shall be cut off," imply in this world, whereas the words of Numbers 15:31, "be cut off (הִכָּרֵת, hikareit)," imply in the next world. As for the repetition in Numbers 15:31 (תִּכָּרֵת, tikareit), Rabbi Ishmael attributed that to the Torah's use of human phraseology. The Gemara taught that both Rabbi Ishmael and Rabbi Akiva utilize the concluding words of Numbers 15:31, "his iniquity shall be upon him," for the purpose taught in a baraita: One might think that the sinner would be cut off even if the sinner repented. Therefore, Numbers 15:31 says, "his iniquity is upon him," meaning that God decreed that the sinner shall be cut off only if the sinner's iniquity is still in him (and the sinner dies unrepentant).

Rabbi Ishmael taught that Scripture speaks in particular of idolatry, for Numbers 15:31 says, "Because he has despised the word of the Lord." Rabbi Ishmael interpreted this to mean that an idolater despises the first word among the Ten Words or Ten Commandments in Exodus 20:2–3 and Deuteronomy 5:6–7, "I am the Lord your God . . . . You shall have no other gods before Me."

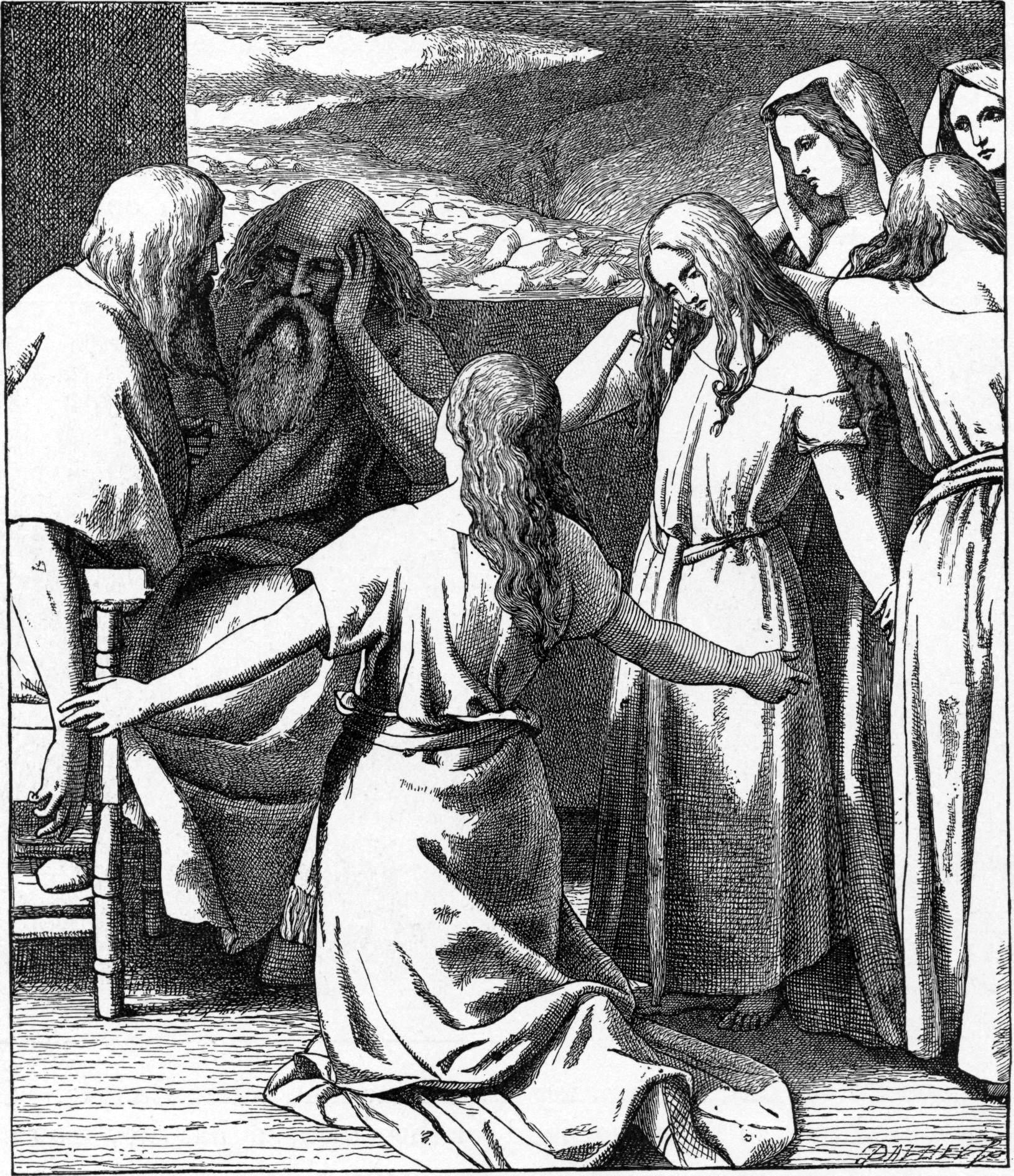
The Daughters of Zelophehad (illustration from the 1897 Bible Pictures and What They Teach Us by Charles Foster)

Rav Ḥisda taught that one walking in a dirty alleyway should not recite the Shema, and one reciting the Shema who comes upon a dirty alleyway should stop reciting. Of one who would not stop reciting, Rav Adda bar Ahavah quoted Numbers 15:31 to say: "he has despised the word of the Lord." And of one who does stop reciting, Rabbi Abbahu taught that Deuteronomy 32:47 says: "through this word you shall prolong your days."

Noting that the words "in the wilderness" appeared both in Numbers 15:32 (which tells the story of the Sabbath violator) and in Numbers 27:3 (where Zelophehad's daughters noted that their father Zelophehad had not taken part in Korah's rebellion) and Rabbi Akiva taught in a baraita that Zelophehad was the man executed for gathering sticks on the Sabbath. Rabbi Judah ben Bathyra answered Akiva that Akiva would have to give an account for his accusation. For either Akiva was right that Zelophehad was the man executed for gathering sticks on the Sabbath, and Akiva revealed something that the Torah shielded from public view, or Akiva was wrong that Zelophehad was the man executed for gathering sticks on the Sabbath, and Akiva cast a stigma upon a righteous man. But the Gemara answered that Akiva learned a tradition from the Oral Torah (that went back to Sinai, and thus the Torah did not shield the matter from public view). The Gemara then asked, according to Rabbi Judah ben Bathyra, of what sin did Zelophehad die (as his daughters reported in Numbers 27:3 that "he died in his own sin")? The Gemara reported that according to Rabbi Judah ben Bathyra, Zelophehad was among those who "presumed to go up to the top of the mountain" in Numbers 14:44 (to try and fail to take the Land of Israel after the incident of the spies).

Tractate Shabbat in the Mishnah, Tosefta, Jerusalem Talmud, and Babylonian Talmud interpreted the laws of the Sabbath in Exodus 16:23 and 29; 20:8–11; 23:12; 31:13–17; 35:2–3; Leviticus 19:3; 23:3; Numbers 15:32–36; and Deuteronomy 5:12.

The Sifra taught that the incidents of the blasphemer in Leviticus 24:11–16 and the wood gatherer in Numbers 15:32–36 happened at the same time, but the Israelites did not leave the blasphemer with the wood gatherer, for they knew that the wood gatherer was going to be executed, as Exodus 31:14 directed, "those who profane it [the Sabbath] shall be put to death." But they did not know the correct form of death penalty for him, for God had not yet been specified what to do to him, as Numbers 15:34 says, "for it had not [yet] been specified what should be done to him." With regard to the blasphemer, the Sifra read Leviticus 24:12, "until the decision of the Lord should be made clear to them," to indicate that they did not know whether or not the blasphemer was to be executed. (And if they placed the blasphemer together with the wood gatherer, it might have caused the blasphemer unnecessary fear, as he might have concluded that he was on death row. Therefore, they held the two separately.)

The Sifri Zutta taught that the passage of the wood-gatherer in Numbers 15:32–36 is juxtaposed to the passage on the fringes in Numbers 15:37–41 to show that a corpse should be buried wearing fringes.

A midrash asked to which commandment Deuteronomy 11:22 refers when it says, "For if you shall diligently keep all this commandment that I command you, to do it, to love the Lord your God, to walk in all His ways, and to cleave to Him, then will the Lord drive out all these nations from before you, and you shall dispossess nations greater and mightier than yourselves." Rabbi Levi said that "this commandment" refers to the recitation of the Shema (Deuteronomy 6:4–9), but the Rabbis said that it refers to the Sabbath, which is equal to all the precepts of the Torah.

The Alphabet of Rabbi Akiva taught that when God was giving Israel the Torah, God told them that if they accepted the Torah and observed God's commandments, then God would give them for eternity a most precious thing that God possessed—the World To Come. When Israel asked to see in this world an example of the World To Come, God replied that the Sabbath is an example of the World To Come.

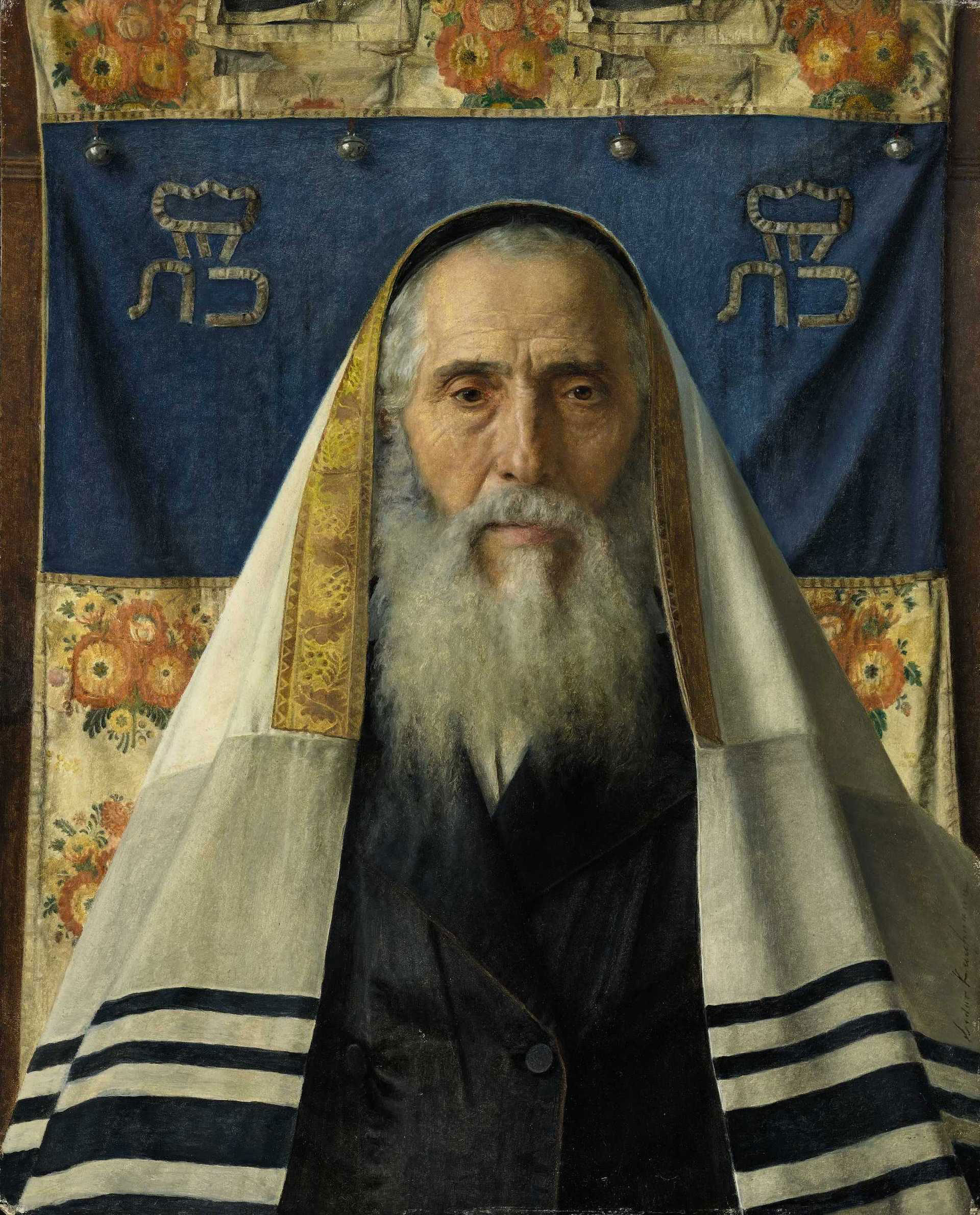
A Rabbi with a Prayer Shawl (tallit) (painting by Isidor Kaufmann (1853–1921))

Already at the time of the Mishnah, Numbers 15:37–41 constituted the third part of a standard Shema prayer that the priests recited daily, following Deuteronomy 6:4–9 and Deuteronomy 11:13–21. The Mishnah instructed that there is a section break in the Shema between reciting Deuteronomy 11:13–21 and reciting Numbers 15:37–41 during which one may give and return greetings out of respect. And similarly, there is a section break between reciting Numbers 15:37–41 and reciting emet veyatziv. But Rabbi Judah said that one may not interrupt between reciting Numbers 15:37–41 and reciting emet veyatziv ("true and enduring . . ."). The Mishnah taught that the reciting of Deuteronomy 11:13–21 precedes the reciting of Numbers 15:37–41 in the Shema because the obligation of Deuteronomy 11:13–21 applies day and night, while the obligation of Numbers 15:37–41 to wear tzizit applies only during the day.

In the Mishnah, Rabbi Elazar ben Azariah argued that Jews must mention the Exodus every night—as one does when one recites the third paragraph of the Shema, Numbers 15:37–41—but did not prevail in his argument that this was a Biblical obligation until Ben Zoma argued that Deuteronomy 16:3, which commands a Jew to remember the Exodus "all the days of your life," uses the word "all" to mean both day and night.

The Gemara asked why the Rabbis included Numbers 15:37–41 in the recitation of Shema, as it contains matter unrelated to the rest of the Shema. Rabbi Judah bar Ḥaviva taught that Numbers 15:37–41 includes five elements, including the primary reason for its inclusion, the Exodus from Egypt: The commandment of ritual fringes, mention of the Exodus from Egypt, the acceptance of the yoke of the commandments, admonition against the opinions of the heretics, admonition against thoughts of the transgressions of licentiousness, and admonition against thoughts of idolatry. The Gemara granted that Numbers 15:37–41 mentions three of these explicitly: Numbers 15:39 mentions the yoke of the commandments when it says: “And you shall look upon them and remember all the commandments of the Lord and you shall do them.” Numbers 15:38 mentions the ritual fringes when it says: “And they will make for themselves ritual fringes.” And Numbers 15:41 mentions the Exodus from Egypt when it says: “I am the Lord, your God, who took you out from the Land of Egypt.” But the Gemara asked where we derive the other elements mentioned above: Admonition against the opinions of the heretics, admonition against thoughts of transgressions of licentiousness, and admonition against thoughts of idolatry. In response, the Gemara cited a baraita that derived these elements from allusions in Numbers 15:39, "You shall stray neither after your hearts nor after your eyes, after which you would lust." The baraita taught that "after your hearts" refers to following opinions of heresy that may arise in one's heart. The Gemara offered as proof Psalm 14:1, which says, "The fool said in his heart: 'There is no God'; they have been corrupt, they have acted abominably; there is none who does good." The baraita taught that "after your eyes" in Numbers 15:39 refers to following thoughts of transgressions of licentiousness, that a person might see and desire, as Judges 14:3 says, "And Samson said to his father, 'That one take for me, for she is upright in my eyes.'" And the baraita taught that the passage in Numbers 15:39, "you shall stray after," refers to promiscuity, which the prophets used as a metaphor for idol worship, as Judges 8:33 says, “The children of Israel again went astray after the Be’alim.”

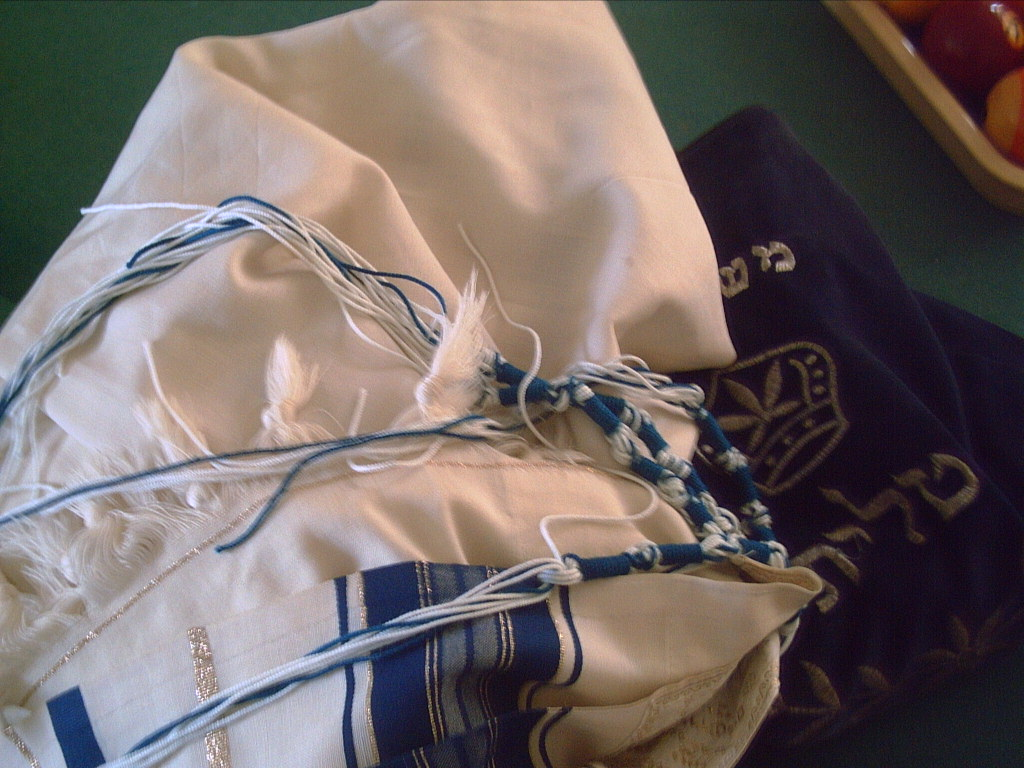
fringes, or tzitzit, on the corner of a prayer shawl, or tallit

It was taught in a baraita that Rabbi Meir used to ask why Numbers 15:38 specified blue from among all the colors for the fringes. Rabbi Meir taught that it was because blue resembles the color of the sea, and the sea resembles the color of the sky, and the sky resembles the color of the Throne of Glory, as Exodus 24:10 says, "And there was under His feet as it were a paved work of sapphire stone," and Ezekiel 1:26 says, "The likeness of a throne as the appearance of a sapphire stone." (And thus, when one sees the blue thread of the fringe, it will help call to mind God.) And it was taught in a baraita that Rabbi Meir used to say that the punishment for failing to observe the white threads of the fringes is greater than for failing to observe the blue threads. The Gemara illustrated this by a parable: A king gave orders to two servants. He asked one servant to bring a seal of clay, and he asked other to bring a seal of gold. And they both failed in their tasks. The Gemara argued that the servant deserving the greater punishment was the one whom the king directed to bring a seal of clay. (For clay is easier to get than gold. Thus the punishment for failing to get the simple white fringe should be greater than the penalty for failing to get the rare blue thread.)

The Tosefta taught that for the blue color to be valid, it had to come from the particular shell that was used for that purpose.

The Mishnah taught that the absence of one of the four fringes required in Numbers 15:38 invalidates the others, as the four together form one precept. Rabbi Ishmael, however, said that the four are four separate precepts.

Noting that Numbers 15:39 says "a fringe" in the singular, the Sifri Zutta deduced that the obligation to wear fringes with a blue thread is a single religious obligation, not two.

In Numbers 15:39, the heart lusts. A midrash catalogued the wide range of additional capabilities of the heart reported in the Hebrew Bible. The heart speaks, sees, hears, walks, falls, stands, rejoices, cries, is comforted, is troubled, becomes hardened, grows faint, grieves, fears, can be broken, becomes proud, rebels, invents, cavils, overflows, devises, desires, goes astray, is refreshed, can be stolen, is humbled, is enticed, errs, trembles, is awakened, loves, hates, envies, is searched, is rent, meditates, is like a fire, is like a stone, turns in repentance, becomes hot, dies, melts, takes in words, is susceptible to fear, gives thanks, covets, becomes hard, makes merry, acts deceitfully, speaks from out of itself, loves bribes, writes words, plans, receives commandments, acts with pride, makes arrangements, and aggrandizes itself.

Like Pseudo-Philo (see "In early nonrabbinic interpretation" above), the Jerusalem Talmud read the commandment to wear tzitzit in Numbers 15:37–40 together with the story of Korah's rebellion that follows immediately after in Numbers 16:1–3. The Jerusalem Talmud told that after hearing the law of tassels, Korah made some garments that were completely dyed blue, went to Moses, and asked Moses whether a garment that was already completely blue nonetheless had to have a blue corner tassel. When Moses answered that it did, Korah said that the Torah was not of Divine origin, Moses was not a prophet, and Aaron was not a high priest.

== In medieval Jewish interpretation ==
The parashah is discussed in these medieval Jewish sources:

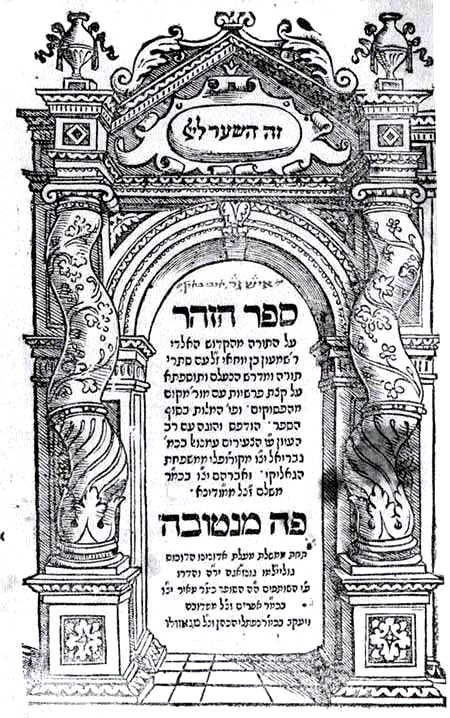
The Title Page of the Zohar

=== Numbers chapter 14 ===
The Zohar found in God's Attributes as expressed in Numbers 14:18 components of God's essential Name. In the Zohar, Rabbi Simeon taught from the Book of Mystery that the Divine Name has both a revealed and a concealed form. In its revealed form, it is written as the four-letter Name of God, the Tetragrammaton, but in its undisclosed form it is written in other letters, and this undisclosed form represents the most Recondite of all. In the Zohar, Rabbi Judah taught that even the revealed form of the Name is hidden under other letters (as the name ADoNaY, אֲדֹנָי, is hidden within ADNY, אדני) in order to screen the most Recondite of all. In the letters of God's Name are concealed 22 attributes of Mercy, namely, the 13 attributes of God in Exodus 34:6–7 and nine attributes of the Mikroprosopus, the lesser revealed aspect of God. They all combine in one composite Name. When people were more reverent, the priests openly enunciated the Name in the hearing of all, but after irreverence became widespread, the Name became concealed under other letters. At the time when the Name was disclosed, the priest would concentrate his mind on its deep and inner meaning, and he would utter the Name in such a way as to accord with that meaning. But when irreverence became common in the world, he would conceal all within the written letters. The Zohar taught that Moses uttered the 22 letters in two sections, first in Exodus 34:6–7 in the attributes of God, and second in Numbers 14:18, when he uttered nine attributes of Mercy that are inherent in the Mikroprosopus, and which are radiated from the light of God. All this the priest combined when he spread forth his hands to bless the people pursuant to Numbers 6:23–26, so that all the worlds received God's blessings. It is for this reason that Numbers 6:23 says simply "saying" (אָמוֹר, amor), instead of the imperative form "say" (אִמְרִי, imri), in a reference to the hidden letters within the words of the Priestly Blessing. The word אָמוֹר, amor has in its letters the numerical value of 248 minus one (א equals 1; מ equals 40; ו equals 6; ר equals 200; and 1 + 40 + 6 + 200 = 247), equal to the number of a man's bodily parts, excepting the one part on which all the rest depend. All these parts thus receive the Priestly Blessing as expressed in the three verses of Numbers 6:24–26.

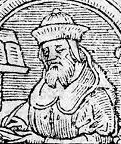
Rashi

Rashi taught that it was on the first day of Elul that God told Moses, in the words of Exodus 34:2, “In the morning you shall ascend Mount Sinai,” to receive the second tablets, and Moses spent 40 days there, as reported in Deuteronomy 10:10, “And I remained upon the mountain just as the first days.” And on Yom Kippur, God was placated toward Israel and told Moses, in the words of Numbers 14:20, “I have forgiven, as you have spoken.”

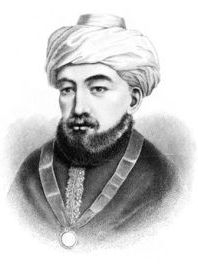
Maimonides

Maimonides taught that the Sages said that inspiration does not come to a prophet when the prophet is sad or languid. Thus Moses did not receive any revelation when he was in a state of depression that lasted from the murmurings of the Israelites upon the evil report of the spies until the death of the warriors of that generation.

=== Numbers chapter 15 ===
Maimonides wrote that he was at a loss why God commanded the offering of wine in Numbers 15:5–11, since idolaters brought wine as an offering. But Maimonides credited another person with suggesting the reason that meat is the best nourishment for the appetite, the source of which is the liver; wine supports best the vital faculty, whose center is the heart; and music is most agreeable to the psychic faculty, the source of which is the brain. Thus, Maimonides wrote, each of a person's faculties approached God with that which it liked best. And thus the sacrifice consisted of meat, wine, and music.

Interpreting the laws of separating a portion of bread (challah) for the priests in Numbers 15:17–21, Maimonides taught that by Rabbinic decree, challah should continue to be separated in the Diaspora, so that the Jewish people will not forget the laws of challah. Anyone who separates challah—both in the Land of Israel and in the Diaspora—should recite the blessing: "Blessed are You . . . Who sanctified us with His commandments and commanded us to separate challah." And Maimonides taught that it is permitted to eat first and then separate the challah in the Diaspora, for the fundamental obligation is Rabbinic in origin.

In his letter to Obadiah the Proselyte, Maimonides relied on Numbers 15:15 to addressed whether a convert could recite declarations like "God of our fathers." Maimonides wrote that converts may say such declarations in the prescribed order and not change them in the least and may bless and pray in the same way as every Jew by birth. Maimonides reasoned that Abraham taught the people, brought many under the wings of the Divine Presence, and ordered members of his household after him to keep God's ways forever. As God said of Abraham in Genesis 18:19, "I have known him to the end that he may command his children and his household after him, that they may keep the way of the Lord, to do righteousness and justice." Ever since then, Maimonides taught, whoever adopts Judaism is counted among the disciples of Abraham. They are Abraham's household, and Abraham converted them to righteousness. In the same way that Abraham converted his contemporaries, he converts future generations through the testament that he left behind him. Thus Abraham is the father of his posterity who keep his ways and of all proselytes who adopt Judaism. Therefore, Maimonides counseled converts to pray, "God of our fathers," because Abraham is their father. They should pray, "You who have taken for his own our fathers," for God gave the land to Abraham when in Genesis 13:17, God said, "Arise, walk through the land in the length of it and in the breadth of it; for I will give to you." Maimonides concluded that there is no difference between converts and born Jews. Both should say the blessing, "Who has chosen us," "Who has given us," "Who have taken us for Your own," and "Who has separated us"; for God has chosen converts and separated them from the nations and given them the Torah. For the Torah has been given to born Jews and proselytes alike, as Numbers 15:15 says, "One ordinance shall be both for you of the congregation, and also for the stranger that sojourns with you, an ordinance forever in your generations; as you are, so shall the stranger be before the Lord." Maimonides counseled converts not to consider their origin as inferior. While born Jews descend from Abraham, Isaac, and Jacob, converts derive from God, through whose word the world was created. As Isaiah said in Isaiah 44:5: "One shall say, I am the Lord's, and another shall call himself by the name of Jacob."

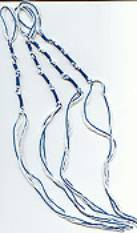
tzitzit

Noting the universal application of the laws of the fringes (צִיצִת, tzitzit) in Numbers 15:38, Maimonides taught that God designed the wearing of tzitzit as a more enduring form of worship than the practice of sacrifices, which Maimonides taught were a transitional step to wean the Israelites off of the worship of the times and move them toward prayer as the primary means of worship. Maimonides noted that in nature, God created animals that develop gradually. For example, when a mammal is born, it is extremely tender, and cannot eat dry food, so God provided breasts that yield milk to feed the young animal, until it can eat dry food. Similarly, Maimonides taught, God instituted many laws as temporary measures, as it would have been impossible for the Israelites suddenly to discontinue everything to which they had become accustomed. So God sent Moses to make the Israelites (in the words of Exodus 19:6) "a kingdom of priests and a holy nation." But the general custom of worship in those days was sacrificing animals in temples that contained idols. So God did not command the Israelites to give up those manners of service, but allowed them to continue. God transferred to God's service what had formerly served as a worship of idols, and commanded the Israelites to serve God in the same manner—namely, to build to a Sanctuary (Exodus 25:8), to erect the altar to God's name (Exodus 20:21), to offer sacrifices to God (Leviticus 1:2), to bow down to God, and to burn incense before God. God forbad doing any of these things to any other being and selected priests for the service in the temple in Exodus 28:41. By this Divine plan, God blotted out the traces of idolatry, and established the great principle of the Existence and Unity of God. But the sacrificial service, Maimonides taught, was not the primary object of God's commandments about sacrifice; rather, supplications, prayers, and similar kinds of worship are nearer to the primary object. Thus, God limited sacrifice to only one temple (see Deuteronomy 12:26) and the priesthood to only the members of a particular family. These restrictions, Maimonides taught, served to limit sacrificial worship, and kept it within such bounds that God did not feel it necessary to abolish sacrificial service altogether. But in the Divine plan, prayer and supplication can be offered everywhere and by every person, as can be the wearing of tzitzit (Numbers 15:38) and tefillin (Exodus 13:9, 16) and similar kinds of service.

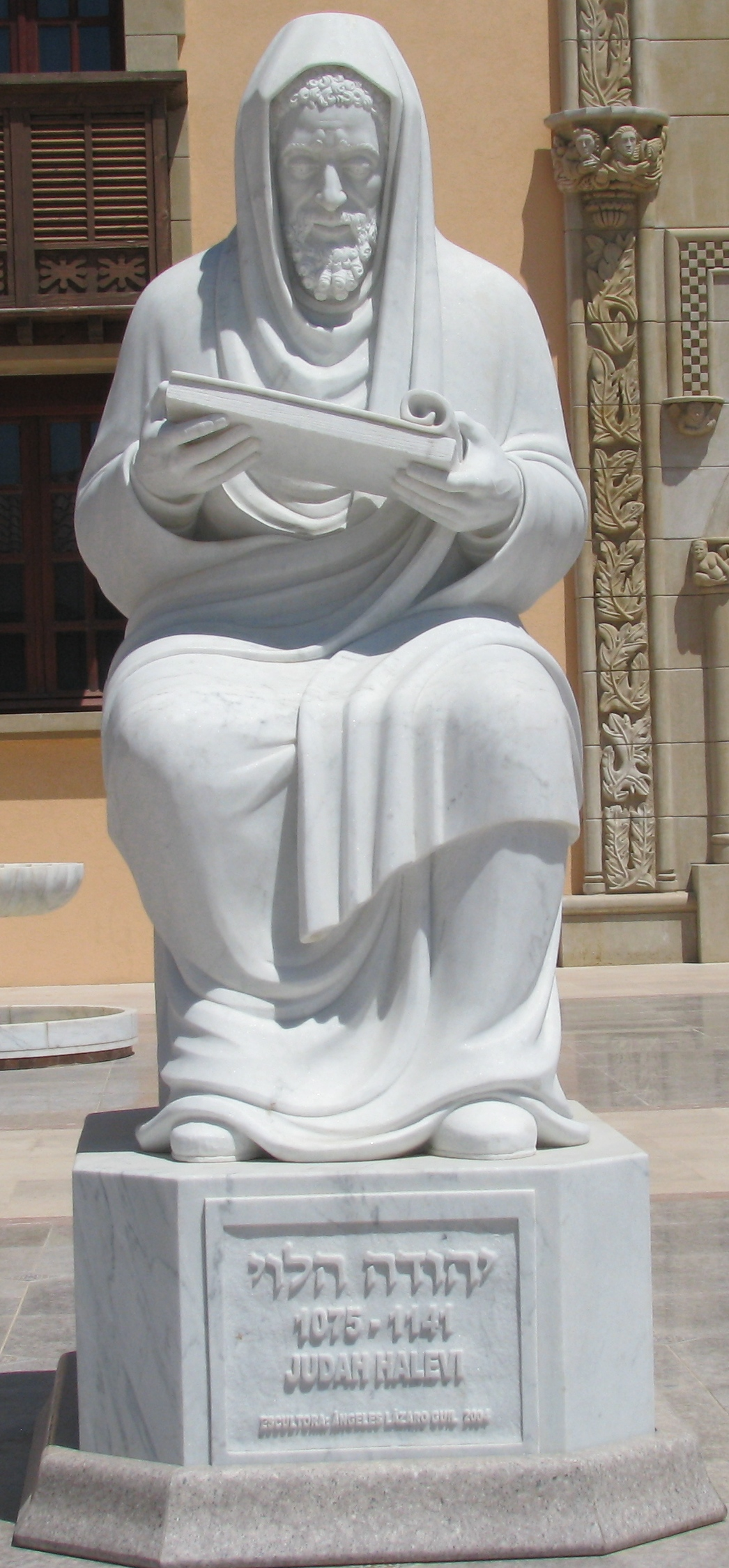
Judah Halevi

Rashi explained that in Numbers 8:8, God required the people to bring a young bull as an offering, because Numbers 15:22–26 required such an offering to make atonement when the community had committed idolatry (and they were atoning for the sin of the Golden Calf).

Yehuda Halevi taught that one wears the fringes lest one be entrapped by worldly thoughts, as Numbers 15:39 says, "That you may not go astray after your heart and after your eyes."

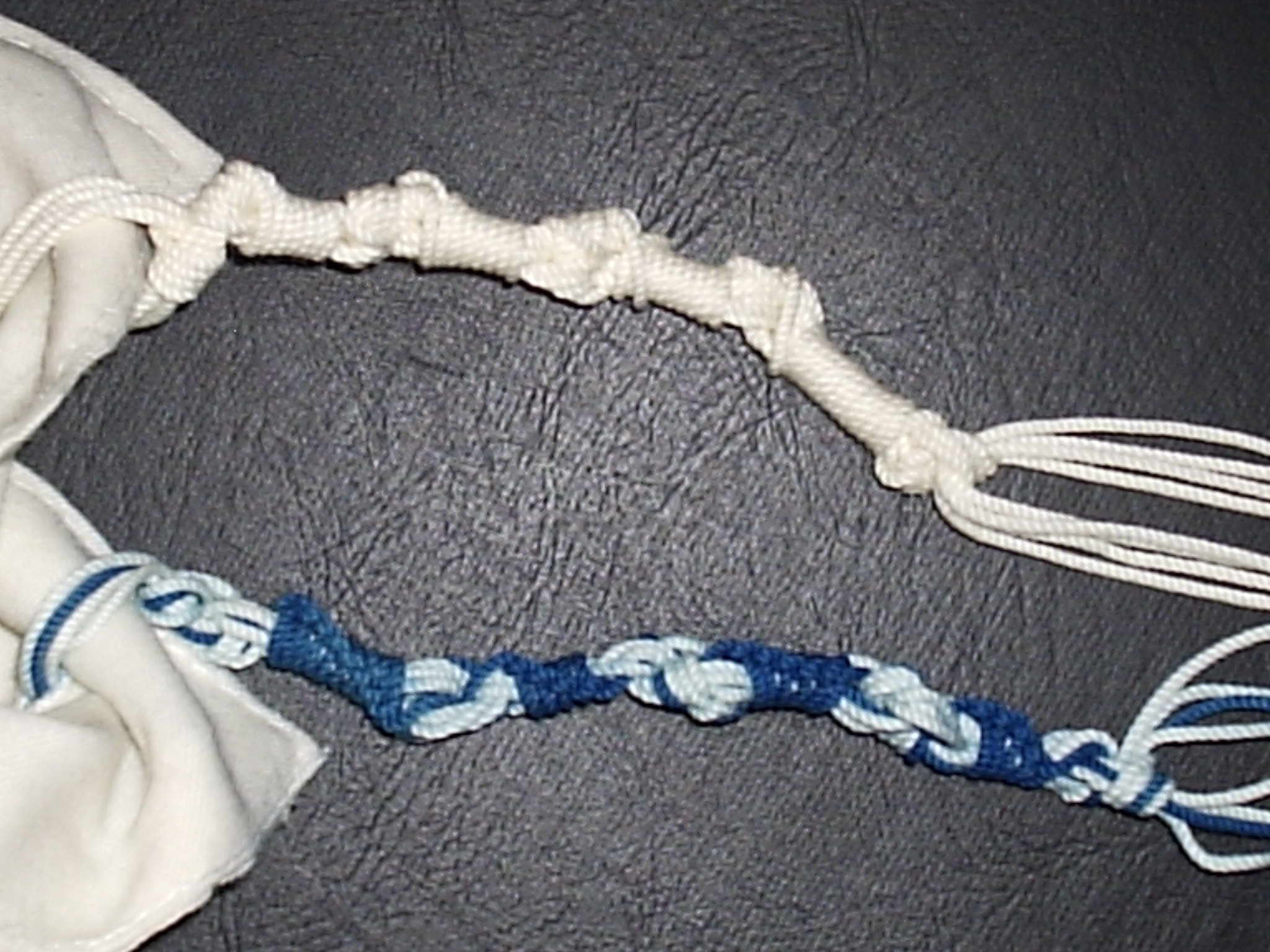
tzitzit

In his Mishneh Torah, Maimonides detailed the laws of the fringes set forth in Numbers 15:37–41. Maimonides taught that the tassel on the fringes of a garment is called tzitzit, because it resembles the locks of hair on one's head, as Ezekiel 8:3 says, "And he took me by the locks (בְּצִיצִת, be-tzitzit) of my head." The Torah does not set a fixed number of strands for the tassel. They take a strand of wool, called techelet, that is dyed sky-blue and wind it around the tassel. The Torah does not set a fixed number of times that this strand should be wound around the tassel. Numbers 15:38, which states, "And you shall make tassels . . . and you shall place on the tassels of the corner a strand of techelet," contains two commandments: (1) to make a tassel on the fringe of a four-cornered garment, and (2) to wind a strand of techelet around the tassel. The absence of techelet, however, does not prevent one from fulfilling the commandment with white strands, as a person who does not have techelet should make tzitzit from white strands alone. Whether the tzitzit a person wears on a garment are white, techelet, or a combination of the two, it is a single commandment, as Numbers 15:39 states, "And they shall be tzitzit for you." The presence of four tzitzit is necessary for the commandment to be fulfilled. Maimonides taught that tzitzit must be made by a Jew, as Numbers 15:38 says: "Speak to the children of Israel . . . and you shall make tzitzit for yourselves."

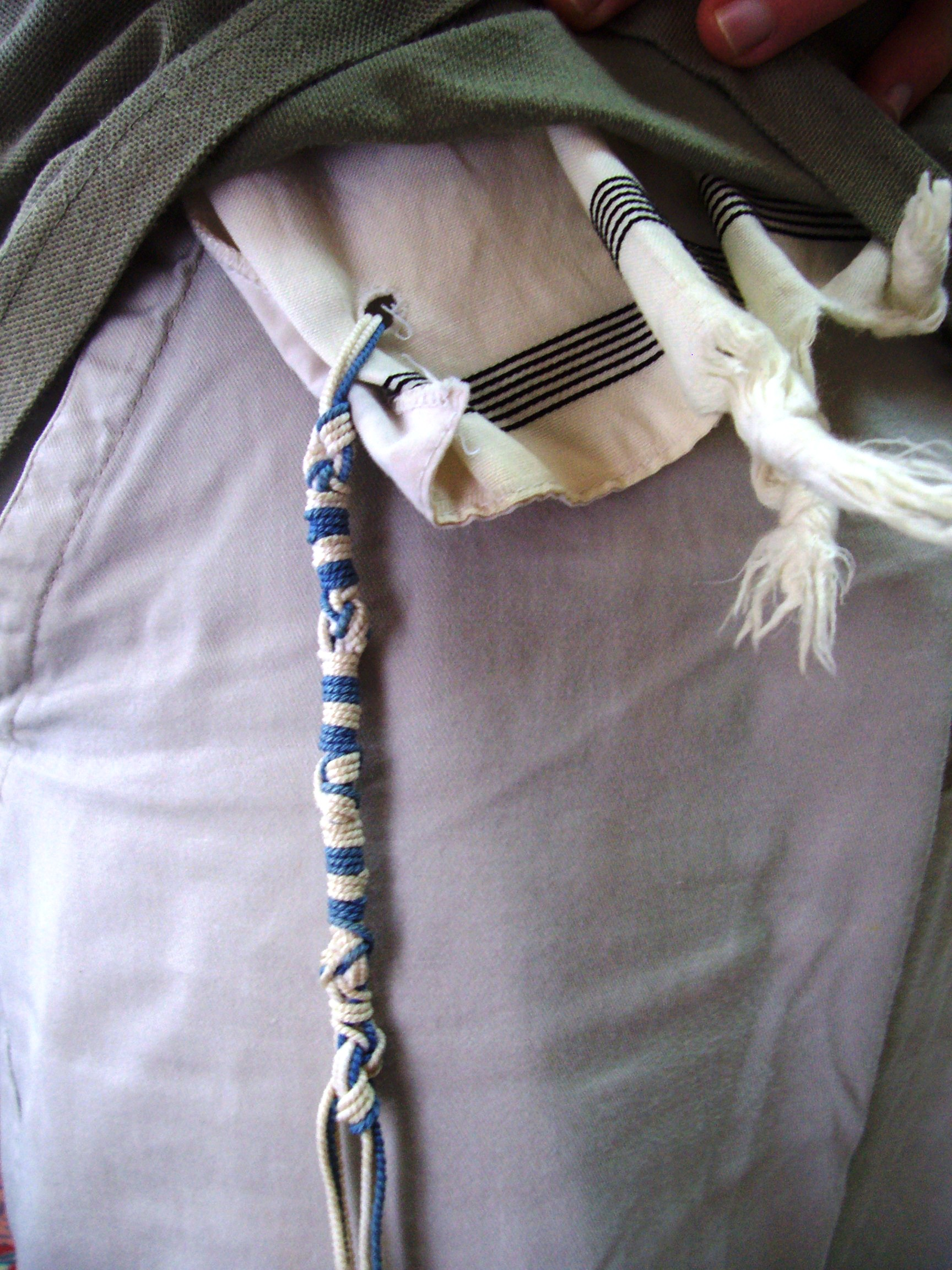
tzitzit

Maimonides taught that techelet refers to wool dyed light blue, the color of the sky opposite the sun on a clear day. The term refers to a specific dye, and use of any other dye is unfit even though it is sky-blue in color. The techelet of tzitzit is dyed by soaking wool in lime. Afterwards, it is taken and washed until it is clean and then boiled with bleach to prepare it to accept the dye. They take the blood of a chilazon fish, found in the Mediterranean Sea, whose color is like the color of the sea and whose blood is black like ink, and place the blood in a pot together with herbs, boil it, and insert the wool until it becomes sky-blue. Maimonides taught that one may buy techelet from an outlet that has established a reputation for authenticity without question, and one may rely on its reputation until a reason for suspicion arises. When a garment is entirely red, green, or any other color other than white, its white strands should be made from the same color as the garment itself. If the garment is techelet, its white strands should be made from any color other than black.

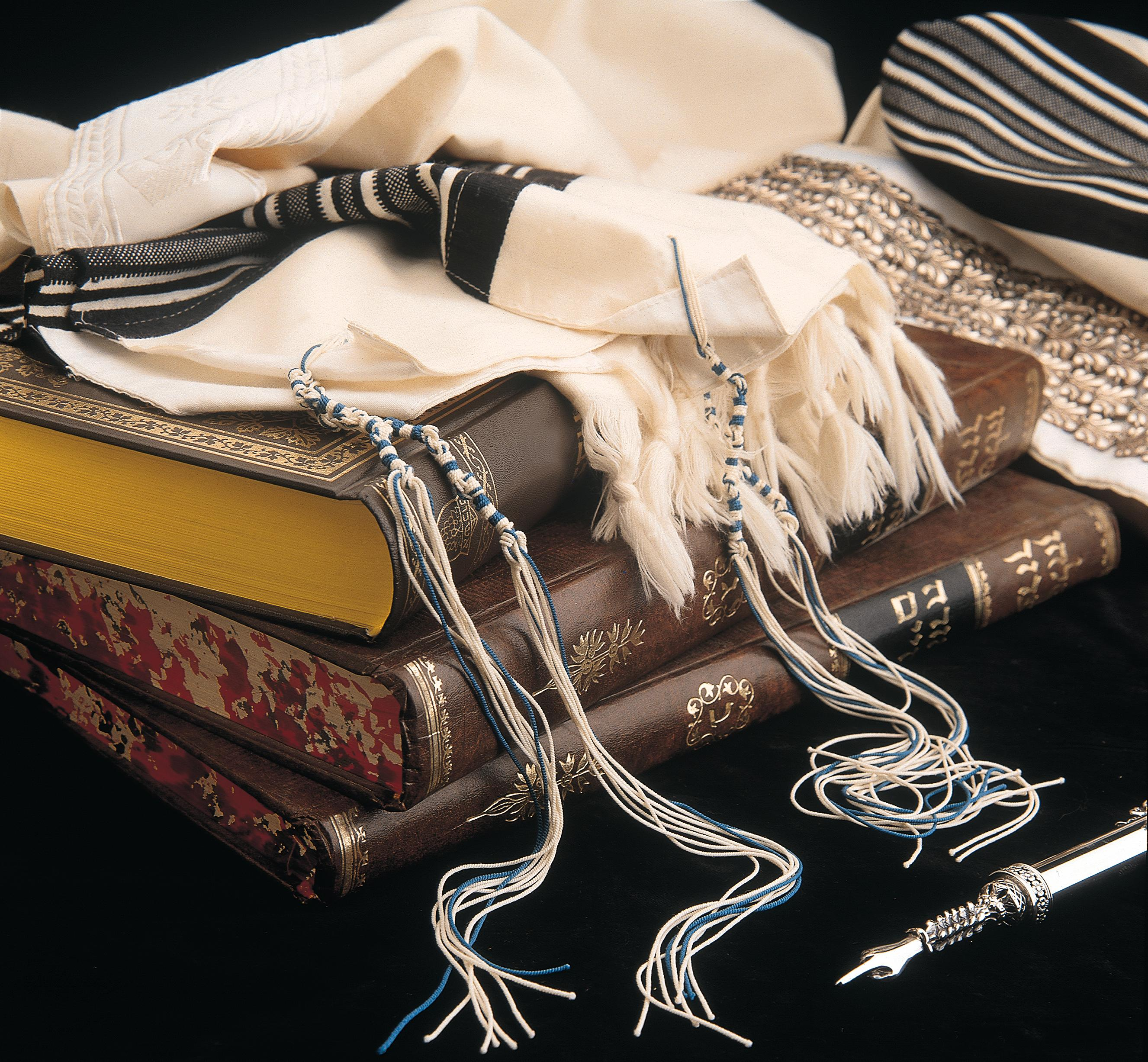
tzitzit

Maimonides taught that a garment to which the Torah obligates a person to attach tzitzit must have three characteristics: (1) it must have four or more corners; (2) it must be large enough to cover both the head and most of the body of a child who is able to walk on his own in the marketplace without having someone watch him; and (3) it must be made of either wool or linen. For a garment of wool, the white strands should be made of wool. For a garment of linen, the white strands should be made of linen. For garments of other fabrics, the white strands should be made from the same fabric as the garment. Numbers 15:39, which says, "And you shall see them," implies that the obligation to wear tzitzit applies during the day, but not at night. Nevertheless, a blind man is obligated to wear tzitzit, for even though he does not see them, others see him wearing them. One is permitted to wear tzitzit at night, provided he does not recite a blessing. One should recite the blessing over tzitzit in the morning when the sun has risen so that one can tell the strands of techelet from those that are white. The blessing is: "Blessed are you, God, our Lord, King of the universe, who has sanctified us with His commandments and commanded us to wrap ourselves with tzitzit." One should recite the blessing anytime he wraps himself in tzitzit during the day. Maimonides taught that the Torah does not require women and children to wear tzitzit, but the Rabbis oblige every boy who knows how to dress himself to wear tzitzit so as to teach him to fulfill commandments. Women who wish to wrap themselves in tzitzit may do so without reciting a blessing, and no one should prevent them. Maimonides taught that there is no obligation to attach tzitzit to a garment that remains folded in place, without a person wearing it. The garment does not require tzitzit. Rather, the person wearing the garment has the obligation. Maimonides taught that even though a person is not obligated to buy a tallit and wrap himself in it so that he must attach tzitzit to it, it is not proper for a person to release himself from the commandment. He should always try to be wrapped in a garment that requires tzitzit so as to fulfill the commandment. In particular, Maimonides taught that one should take care to be wrapped in a tallit during prayer, and it is very shameful for a Torah scholar to pray without being wrapped in a tallit. And Maimonides taught that a person should always be careful regarding the commandment of tzitzit, because Numbers 15:39, which says "And you shall see them and remember all the commandments of God," implies that the commandment of tzitzit is considered equal to all the commandments and all the commandments are considered dependent on it.

Citing Numbers 15:39, Baḥya ibn Paquda taught that not to seek after your own heart is a leading example of a negative duty of the heart. Baḥya also cited Numbers 15:39 for the proposition that a tainted motive renders even numerous good deeds unacceptable.

The Sefer ha-Chinuch cited Numbers 15:39 for the commandment not to wander after the thoughts of the heart and the vision of the eyes. The Sefer ha-Chinuch interpreted this negative commandment to prevent one from dedicating one's thoughts to opinions that are antithetical to those on which the Torah is built, as that may lead one to apostasy. Rather, if the spirit to pursue these bad opinions should arise, one should minimize one's thinking about them, and redouble one's efforts to contemplate the ways of the Torah. Similarly, one should not pursue the things one sees, including the desires of this world. The Sefer ha-Chinuch taught this commandment is a fundamental principle in Judaism, as evil thoughts are the progenitors of impurities, and actions follow them. The Sefer ha-Chinuch taught that the more one allows oneself to be governed by one's desires and allows them to become habit, the stronger one's evil inclination becomes. But if one conquers one's evil inclination and closes one's eyes from seeing evil one time, it will be easier to do so many times. The Sefer ha-Chinuch taught that this commandment is practiced in all places and at all times by both men and women. But the Sefer ha-Chinuch taught that they did not administer lashes for this negative commandment, because there is no specific thing for which the transgressor can be warned, as people are made in such a way that it is impossible for their eyes not to sometimes see more than what is fitting, and it is similarly impossible for human thought not to sometimes go beyond what is fitting, so it is impossible to limit people with clear boundaries.

== In modern interpretation ==
The parashah is discussed in these modern sources:

=== Numbers chapter 13 ===
Shlomo Luntschitz (the Kli Yakar) reported a midrash that taught that God told Moses that with God's knowledge of the future, God knew that it would be better to send women who cherish the Land because they would not count its faults. But, God told Moses (in the words of Numbers 13:2), "for you (לְךָ, lecha)," with the knowledge Moses had, if he thought that these men were fit and the Land was dear to them, then Moses could send men. Therefore, God told Moses (once again, in the words of Numbers 13:2), "send for yourselves (שְׁלַח-לְךָ, shelach-lecha)," according to the level of knowledge that Moses had, men. But according to God's level of knowledge, it would have been better, God said, to send women.

Nathan MacDonald reported some dispute over the exact meaning of the description of the Land of Israel as a "land flowing with milk and honey," as in Numbers 13:27 and 14:8, as well as Exodus 3:8 and 17, 13:5, and 33:3, Leviticus 20:24, and Deuteronomy 6:3, 11:9, 26:9 and 15, 27:3, and 31:20. MacDonald wrote that the term for milk (חָלָב, chalav) could easily be the word for "fat" (חֵלֶב, chelev), and the word for honey (דְבָשׁ, devash) could indicate not bees' honey but a sweet syrup made from fruit. The expression evoked a general sense of the bounty of the land and suggested an ecological richness exhibited in a number of ways, not just with milk and honey. MacDonald noted that the expression was always used to describe a land that the people of Israel had not yet experienced, and thus characterized it as always a future expectation.

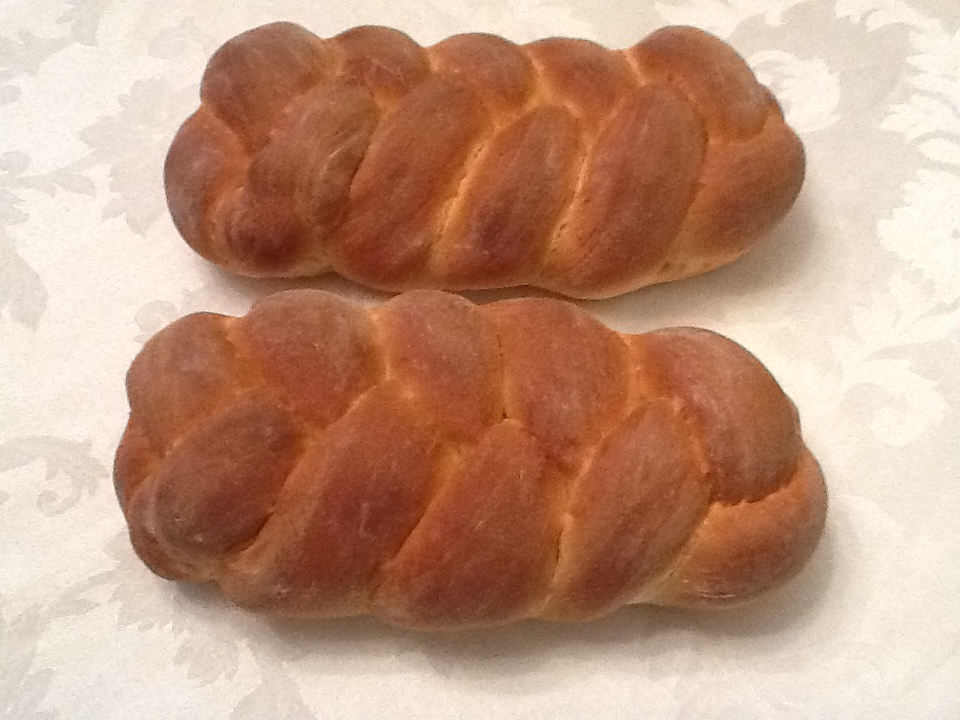
challah loaves

=== Numbers chapter 15 ===
The Rabbis, seeking to preserve the commandment of separating a portion of bread (challah) for the priests in Numbers 15:17–21, created a symbolic observance under which a small portion of each batch of dough is to be twisted off and burned in an open flame. From this act of twisting a piece of dough comes the custom of braiding the Sabbath loaf as a reminder that challah was taken, and hence, also, comes the name "challah" for the Sabbath loaf.

In 1950, the Committee on Jewish Law and Standards of Conservative Judaism ruled: “Refraining from the use of a motor vehicle is an important aid in the maintenance of the Sabbath spirit of repose. Such restraint aids, moreover, in keeping the members of the family together on the Sabbath. However where a family resides beyond reasonable walking distance from the synagogue, the use of a motor vehicle for the purpose of synagogue attendance shall in no wise be construed as a violation of the Sabbath but, on the contrary, such attendance shall be deemed an expression of loyalty to our faith. . . . [I]n the spirit of a living and developing Halachah responsive to the changing needs of our people, we declare it to be permitted to use electric lights on the Sabbath for the purpose of enhancing the enjoyment of the Sabbath, or reducing personal discomfort in the performance of a mitzvah.”

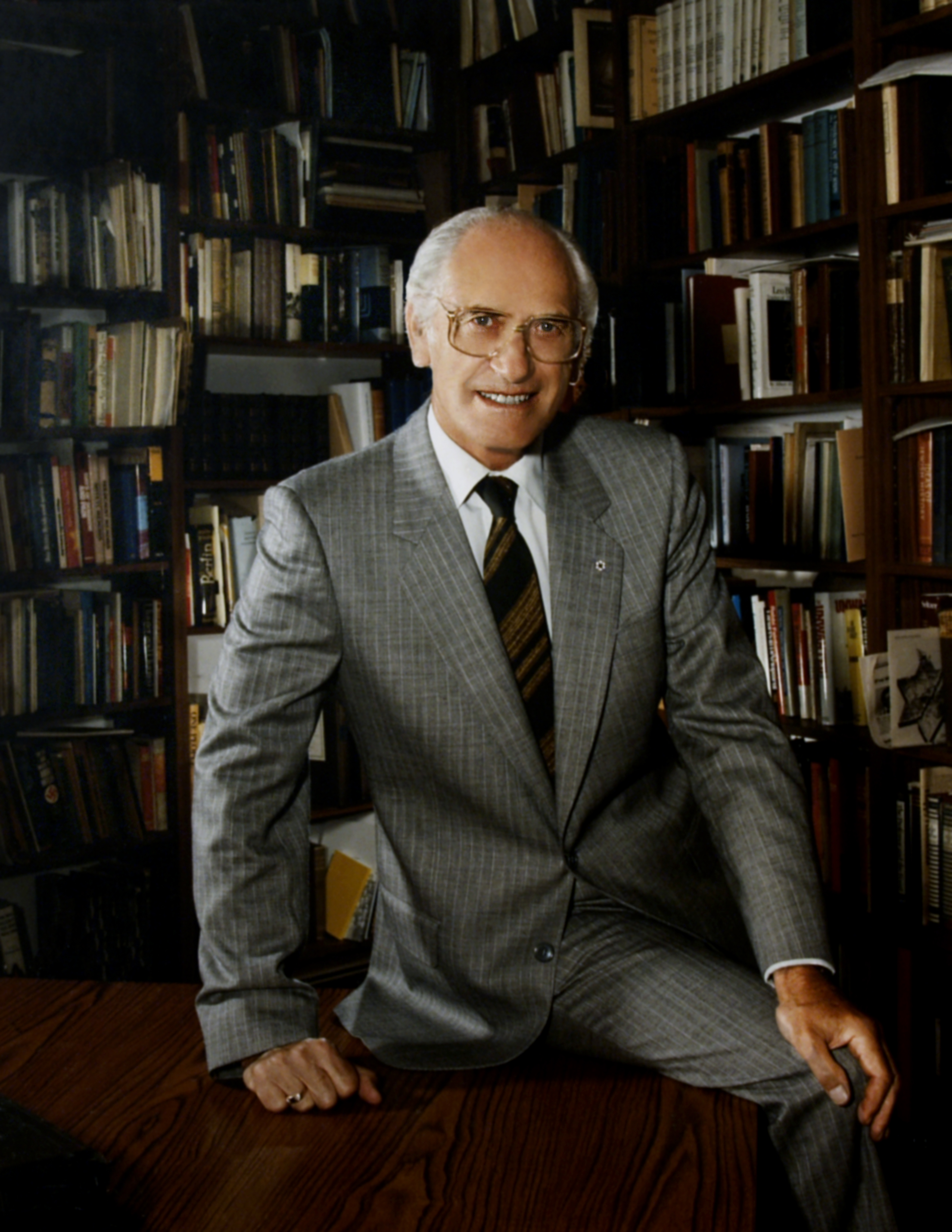
Plaut

Gunther Plaut argued that Exodus 35:3 includes the words "throughout your settlements" to make clear that the injunction not to kindle fire on the Sabbath applied not only during the building of the Tabernacle, to which the prohibition primarily related. Thus Numbers 15:32, reporting a man gathering sticks on the Sabbath, recorded a violation of Exodus 35:3.

Bernard Bamberger noted that Numbers 15:32–34 is one of four episodes in the Torah (along with Leviticus 24:12 and Numbers 9:6–8 and 27:1–5) in which Moses had to make a special inquiry of God before he could give a legal decision. Bamberger reported that the inability of Moses to handle these cases on his own troubled the Rabbis.

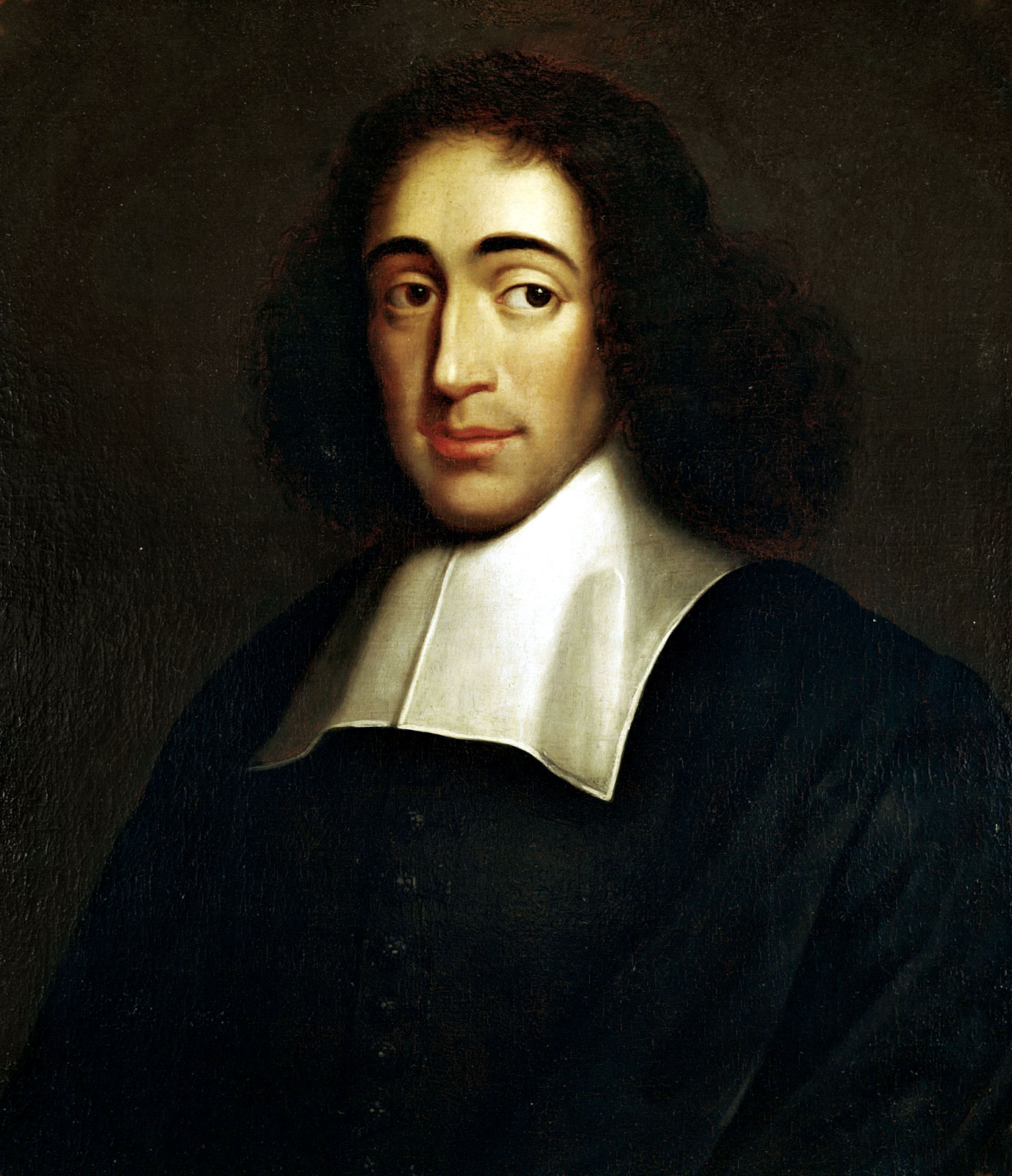
Spinoza

Baruch Spinoza wrote that because religion only acquires the force of law by means of the sovereign power, Moses was not able to punish those who, before the covenant, and consequently while still in possession of their rights, violated the Sabbath (in Exodus 16:27), but Moses was able to do so after the covenant (in Numbers 15:36), because all the Israelites had then yielded up their natural rights, and the ordinance of the Sabbath had received the force of law.

In April 2014, the Committee on Jewish Law and Standards of Conservative Judaism ruled that women are now equally responsible for observing commandments as men have been, and thus that women are responsible for observing the commandment in Numbers 15:37–40 to wear tzitzit.

Robert Alter translated Numbers 15:38 to call for "an indigo twist" on the Israelites’ garments. Alter explained that the dye was not derived from a plant, as is indigo, but from a substance secreted by the murex, harvested off the coast of Phoenicia. The extraction and preparation of this dye were labor-intensive and thus quite costly. It was used for royal garments in many places in the Mediterranean region, and in Israel it was also used for priestly garments and for the cloth furnishings of the Tabernacle. Alter argued that the indigo twist betokened the idea that Israel should become (in the words of Exodus 19:6) a "kingdom of priests and a holy nation" and perhaps also that, as the covenanted people, metaphorically God's firstborn, the nation as a whole had royal status. Similarly, Nili Fox wrote that it is no accident that the violet-blue wool cord that Numbers 15:37–40 required be attached to the fringes is identical to the cord that hangs from the priest's headdress in Exodus 28:37. Fox argued that the tzitzit on the Israelites’ garments identified them as being holy to God and symbolically connected them to the priests. Thereby, the Israelites pledged their loyalty to God as well as to the priests who oversaw the laws. And similarly, Terence Fretheim argued that tassels, worn by royalty in the ancient Near East, were to be attached to each corner of everyone's garments, with a blue/purple cord on each, as a public sign of Israel's status as a holy people and a reminder of what that entailed.

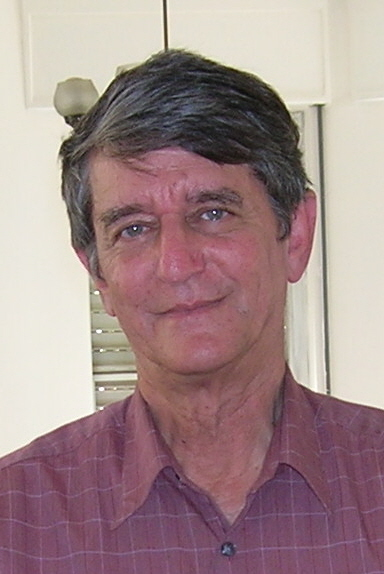
Kugel

James Kugel wrote that early interpreters saw in the juxtaposition of the law of tzitzit in Numbers 15:37–40 with the story of Korah's rebellion in Numbers 16:1–3 a subtle hint as to how Korah might have enlisted his followers. Forcing people to put a special blue tassel on their clothes, ancient interpreters suggested Korah must have argued, was an intolerable intrusion into their lives. Korah asked why, if someone's whole garment was already dyed blue, that person needed to add an extra blue thread to the corner tassel. But this question, ancient interpreters implied, was really a metaphorical version of Korah's complaint in Numbers 16:3: "Everyone in the congregation [of Levites] is holy, and the Lord is in their midst. So why then do you exalt yourselves above the assembly of the Lord?" In other words, Korah asserted that all Levites were part of the same garment and all blue, and asked why Moses and Aaron thought that they were special just because they were the corner thread. In saying this, Kugel argued, Korah set a pattern for would-be revolutionaries thereafter to seek to bring down the ruling powers with the taunt: "What makes you better than the rest of us?" Kugel wrote that ancient interpreters thus taught that Korah was not really interested in changing the system, but merely in taking it over. Korah was thus a dangerous demagogue.

== Commandments ==
According to Maimonides and the Sefer ha-Chinuch, there are 2 positive and 1 negative commandments in the parashah.

- To set aside a portion of dough for a Kohen
- To have tzitzit on four-cornered garments
- Not to stray after the whims of one's heart or temptations one sees with his eyes

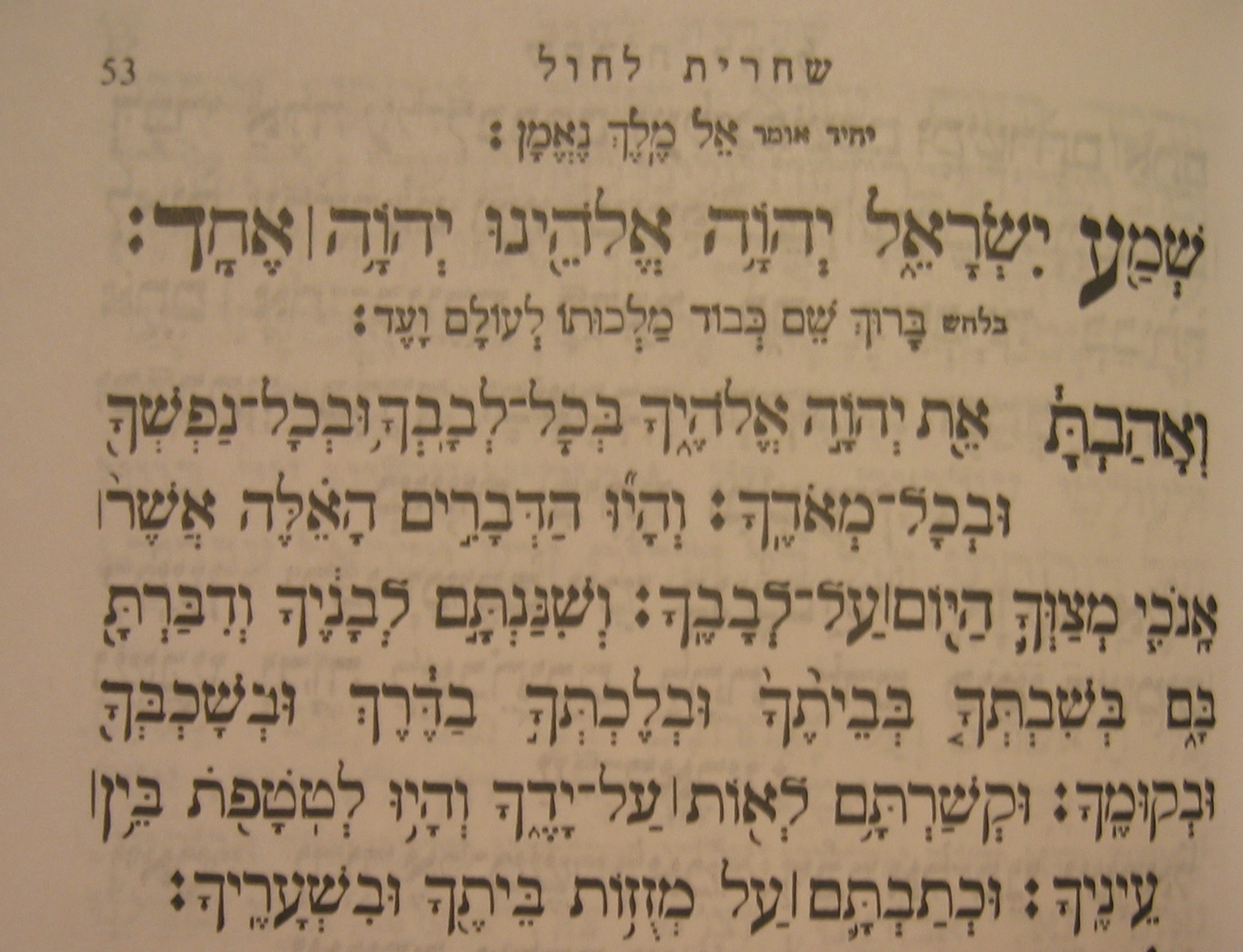
The beginning of the Shema prayer in the Siddur

== In the liturgy ==
Numbers 14:19–20 are recited immediately following the Kol Nidre prayer on Yom Kippur. The leader recites verse 19, then the leader and congregation recite verse 20 three times.

Some Jews read how the generation of the Wilderness tested God ten times in Numbers 14:22 as they study Pirkei Avot chapter 5 on a Sabbath between Passover and Rosh Hashanah.

The rebellious generation and their Wilderness death foretold in Numbers 14:35 are reflected in Psalm 95:10–11, which is in turn the first of the six Psalms recited at the beginning of the Kabbalat Shabbat prayer service.

Numbers 15:37–41 is the third of three blocks of verses in the Shema, a central prayer in Jewish prayer services. Jews combine Deuteronomy 6:4–9, Deuteronomy 11:13–21, and Numbers 15:37–41 to form the core of K'riat Shema, recited in the evening (Ma'ariv) and morning (Shacharit) prayer services.

Reuven Hammer noted that Mishnah Tamid recorded what was in effect the first siddur, as a part of which priests daily recited Numbers 15:37–41.

Observant Jewish men (and some women, although the law does not require them to do so) don a tallit daily, often at the very beginning of the day, in observance of Numbers 15:38, and say an accompanying blessing

Jews recite the conclusion of Numbers 15:41 in the Kedushah section of the Mussaf Amidah prayer on Sabbath mornings.

== The Weekly Maqam ==
In the Weekly Maqam, Sephardi Jews each week base the songs of the services on the content of that week's parashah. For parashah Shlach, Sephardi Jews apply Maqam Hijaz, the maqam that expresses mourning and sadness, which is appropriate because the parashah contains the episode of the spies and the punishment of Israel.

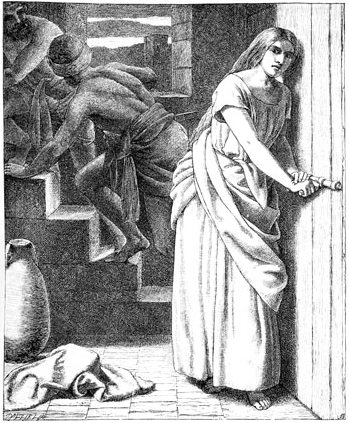
Rahab Receives and Conceals the Spies (19th-century illustration by Frederick Richard Pickersgill)

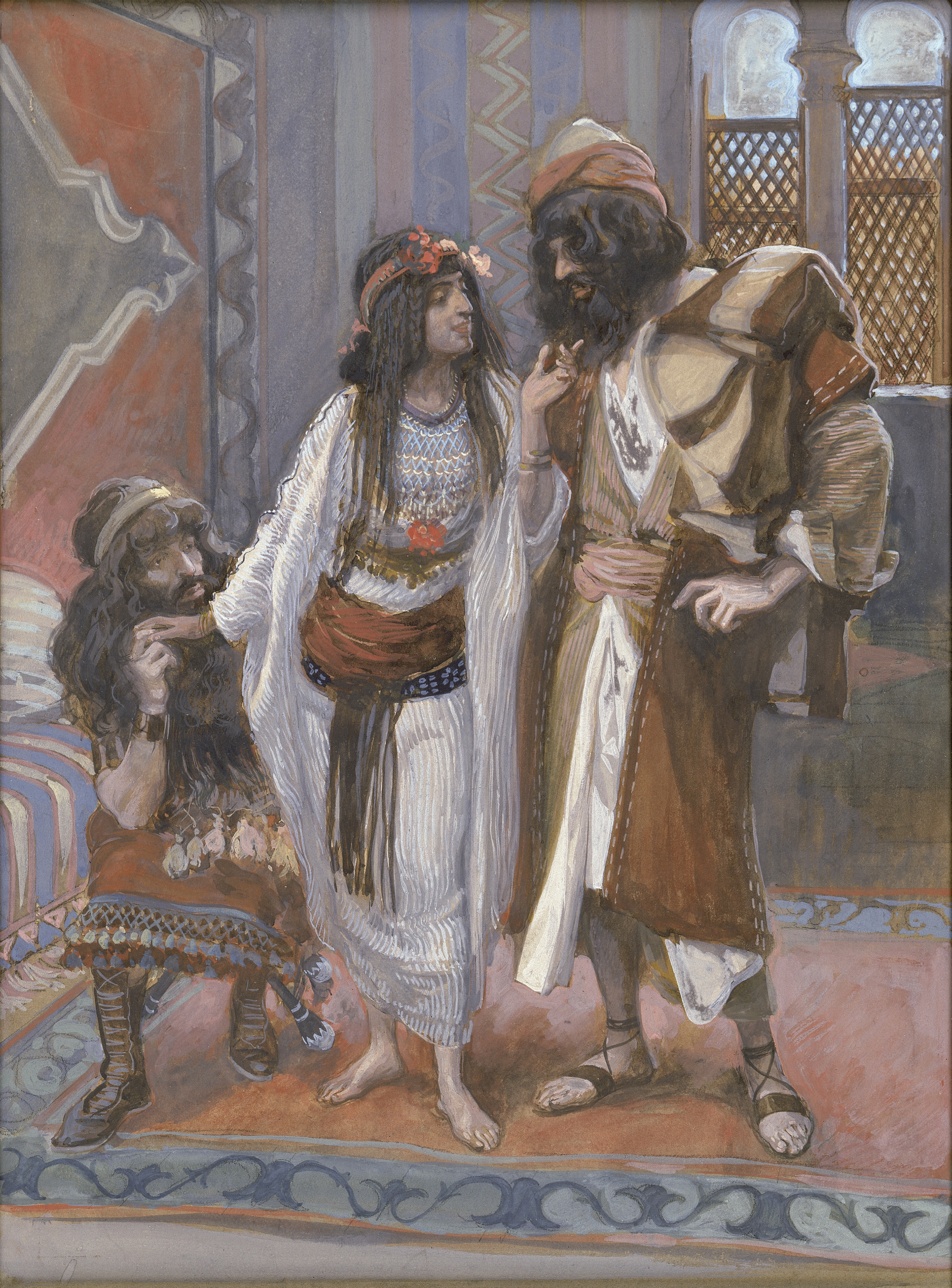
The Harlot of Jericho and the Two Spies (watercolor circa 1896–1902 by James Tissot)

== Haftarah ==
The haftarah for the parashah is Joshua 2:1–24.

=== Summary of the haftarah ===
Joshua secretly dispatched two spies from Shittim, instructing them to view the land and Jericho, and they went to the house of a harlot named Rahab. That night, the king of Jericho received word that Israelite men had come to search out the land, and the king sent a demand to Rahab to deliver the men who had come to her house. But Rahab hid the men among stalks of flax on her roof, saying that when it was dark the men had left, and she did not know where they went. The king's men left the city in pursuit of the spies on the road to the Jordan River, and the people of the city shut the city gate after them.

Rahab promptly went up to the spies on the roof and told them that she knew that God had given the Israelites the land, and that the people lived in terror of the Israelites, having heard how God dried up the Red Sea before them and how the Israelites had destroyed the forces of Sihon and Og. So Rahab asked the spies to swear by God, since she had dealt kindly with them, that they would also deal kindly with her father's house and give her a token to save her family from the coming invasion. The spies told her that if she would not tell of their doings, then when God gave the Israelites the land, they would deal kindly with her. She let them down by a cord through her window, as her house was on the city wall. She told them to hide in the mountain for three days. They told her that when the Israelites came to the land, she was to bind in her window the scarlet rope by which she let the spies down and gather her family into her house for safety, as all who ventured out of the doors of her house would die. She agreed, sent them on their way, and bound the scarlet line in her window.

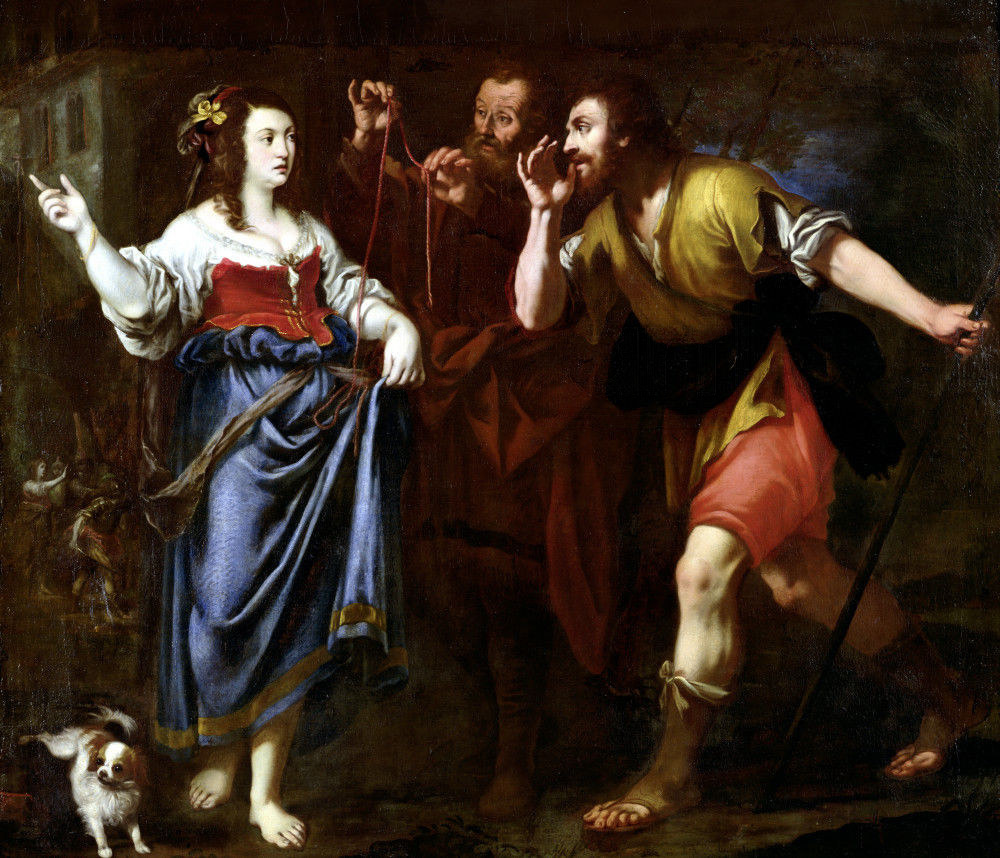
Rahab and the Emissaries of Joshua (17th-century painting)

The spies hid in the mountain for three days, and the pursuers did not find them. The spies returned to the Israelite camp and told Joshua all that had happened, saying that surely God had delivered the land into their hands and the inhabitants would melt away before them.

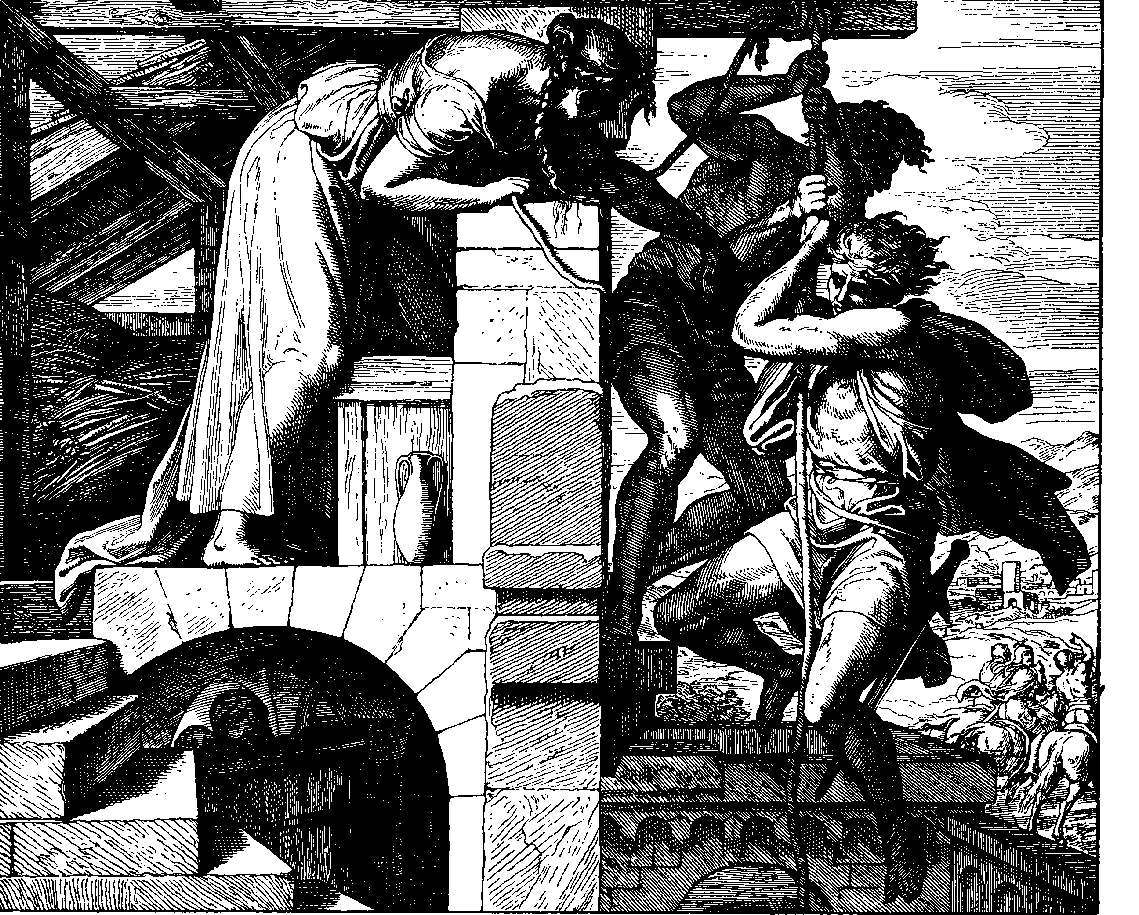
Escape from Rahab's House (woodcut by Julius Schnorr von Carolsfeld from the 1860 Bible in Pictures)

=== Connection between the haftarah and the parashah ===
Both the parashah and the haftarah deal with spies sent to scout out the land of Israel, the parashah in connection with the ten scouts sent to reconnoiter the whole land, and the haftarah in connection with the two spies sent to reconnoiter Jericho. Joshua participated in both ventures, as a scout in the parashah, and as the leader who sent the spies in the haftarah. In the parashah, God complained about how the Israelites did not believe the "signs" (אֹתוֹת, otot) that God had sent, and in the haftarah, Rahab asked the spies for a true "sign" (אוֹת, ot) so that she might believe them.

Whereas in the parashah, the spies were well-known men, in the haftarah, Joshua dispatched the spies secretly. Whereas in the parashah, Moses sent a large number of 12 spies, in the haftarah, Joshua sent just 2 spies. Whereas in the parashah, many of the spies cowered before the Canaanites, in the haftarah, the spies reported that the Canaanites would melt before the Israelites. Whereas in the parashah, the spies reported their findings publicly, in the haftarah, the spies reported directly to Joshua.

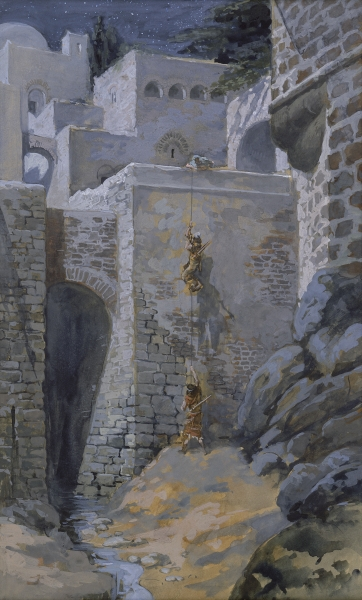
The Flight of the Spies (watercolor circa 1896–1902 by James Tissot)

=== The haftarah in classical Rabbinic interpretation ===
A midrash taught that no other people sent to perform a religious duty and risk their lives on a mission could compare with the two spies whom Joshua sent. The Rabbis taught that the two were Phinehas and Caleb. The midrash noted that Joshua 2:1 says, "Joshua the son of Nun sent out of Shittim two spies secretly" (חֶרֶשׁ, cheresh). The midrash read the word חֶרֶשׁ, cheresh ("secretly"), as חָרֶשׂ, chares, "earthenware", to teach that the two spies took with them earthenware pots and cried, "Here are pots! Whoever wishes, let him come and buy!" so that no one might detect them or say that they were spies.

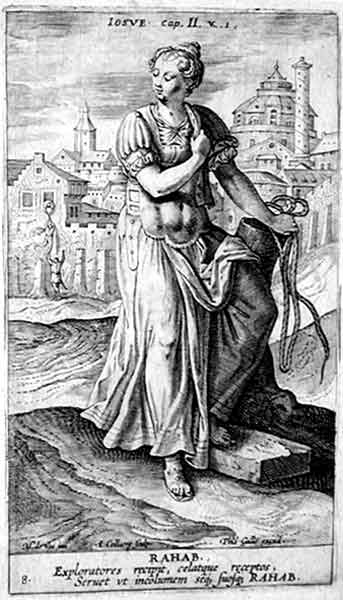
Rahab of Jericho (engraving circa 1581 from Celebrated Women of the Old Testament by Hans or Adrien Collaert and Carel van Mallery)

The Rabbis taught that Rahab was one of the four most beautiful women who ever lived, along with Sarah, Abigail, and Esther. The Rabbis taught that Rahab inspired lust by the mere mention of her name. Rabbi Isaac taught that saying Rahab's name twice would cause a man immediately to lose control. Rav Nachman protested that he said Rahab's name twice and nothing happened to him. Rabbi Isaac replied that he meant that this would happen to any man who knew her.

A midrash explained that Joshua 2:4 speaks of Rahab's hiding "him" instead of "them" because Phinehas, as a prophet, had the power to make himself invisible.

A midrash deduced from Joshua 2:4 and 1 Chronicles 4:22 that Rahab lied to the king, and was prepared to be burned to death in punishment for doing so, for she attached herself to Israel.

A midrash taught that for hiding the spies, God rewarded the convert Rahab with priestly descendants.

Reading Joshua 2:9, a midrash noted that Rahab, like Israel, Jethro, and the Queen of Sheba, came to the Lord after hearing of God's miracles.

Rabbi Eleazar recounted that Rahab knew in Joshua 2:10–11 that the Canaanites had lost heart because they had lost their virility.

The Rabbis taught that Rahab's attribution in Joshua 2:11 of God's presence to both heaven and earth demonstrated greater faith in God than Jethro or Naaman, but not as much as Moses.

Rabbi Samuel son of Naḥman faulted Joshua in Joshua 2:12–14 for keeping faith with Rahab in disobedience to God's command in Deuteronomy 20:17 to "utterly destroy" all of the Canaanites.

The Mekhilta of Rabbi Ishmael taught that as the events of Joshua 2:15 took place, Rahab converted to Judaism, at the end of her fiftieth year. She said before God that she had sinned in three ways. And she asked to be forgiven on account of three things—on account of the red cord, the window, and the wall. "Then," in the words of Joshua 2:15, "she let them down by a cord through the window, for her house was upon the side of the wall, and she dwelt upon the wall."

A midrash deduced from Joshua 2:16 that Rahab received a prophetic vision of what the spies' pursuers would do.
