= Bat-Kohen =

Daughter of a kohen

A bat-kohen or bat kohen (Hebrew: בת כהן) is the daughter of a kohen (Jewish priest), who holds a special status in the Hebrew Bible and rabbinical texts. She is entitled to a number of rights and is encouraged to abide by specified requirements, for example, entitlement to consume some of the priestly gifts, and an increased value for her ketubah.

== Hebrew Bible ==
In the Bible, both Joseph and Moses married daughters of non-Jewish (Egyptian and Midianite) priests. However, in rabbinic literature the term bat kohen refers exclusively to daughters of Jewish priests, the descendants of Aaron.

If the daughter of a priest engaged in illicit sexual relations, her penalty was to be burned; in contrast to the usual penalty which was strangulation.

Daughters of priests were allowed to eat the sanctified gifts to priests (terumot hakodashim), just as sons of priests, and priests themselves, were allowed to.

Rabbinic sources describe Tamar as the daughter of Shem, and consider Shem have been a priest before the priestly covenant was given to Aaron. This explains why Judah suggested she be burned to death for her alleged sexual affair, as burning is a form of punishment which the Torah generally reserves for daughters of priests.

== New Testament ==
The term "daughter of Aaron" is given to several women in the New Testament, among them Elizabeth, mother of John the Baptist, and it was not considered unusual for "daughters of Aaron" to marry someone of the priestly tribe.

== In rabbinic literature ==
=== Marriage preferences ===
Although basic Torah law allows for the bat kohen to marry a challal, convert and freed slave (Hebrew eved me shukhrar), the Midrash and Talmud cite Rabbi Yochanan's view that a daughter of a priest is best off marrying a priest. Rabbi Yochanan maintains that in the event a bat kohen marries a non-Kohen, undesired results for the groom are likely to surface, such as poverty or the demise of the groom. An exception to this taboo is if the groom is a Talmid Chacham.

The Talmud narrates how the Tanna Rabbi Yehoshua married a non-kohen wife and then complained that it weakened him. Rashi explains that the marriage of a bat kohen to a man who is not a kohen, or a Talmid Chacham, is considered a swipe at the honor of Aaron, and Aaron himself is annoyed at the demotion of his progeny, resulting in a negative consequence.

British Chief Rabbi Nathan Marcus Adler ruled in 1863 that the daughter of a Cohen may only marry a non-Cohen.

=== Consumption of priestly gifts ===
The types of sacrifices the bat-kohen is afforded include the breast and thigh of the peace offering, the four loaves of the thank offering, and the foreleg of the Nazirite's ram offering.

The bat-kohen may offer her employees to partake in her terumah. Technically, she may bypass her father (or husband) and initially give her tithe offering and dough offering, but Menachem Meiri forbids this of concern that one may give these gifts in error to the wife of a Kohen who was initially the daughter of an Israelite post her divorce, such giving the gifts to a person who is no longer entitled to the gifts.

The daughter of a priest is likewise permitted to consume the firstborn animal. Regarding the foreleg, cheeks and maw, there is a Tannaitic dispute (between the schools of Rabbi Yishmael and Rabbi Eliezer Ben Yaakov) as to whether an Israelite performs his mitzvah by giving them to the bat-kohen.

=== Ketubah ===
The priestly court (prior to 70 CE) established that a virgin bat-kohen would receive a ketubah of 400 Zuz (rather than the standard 200 Zuz for a Jewish virgin). (However, the Talmud Yerushalmi opines that the bat-kohen who marries a non-Kohen receives that standard 200 Zuz, as a penalty for not marrying within the priesthood.) A widowed bat-kohen would receive the standard 100 Zuz for widows, though at one point this sum had been raised to 200 Zuz.

Rabbeinu Tam clarifies that the words in Ketuboth "that which is due you" (Aramaic d'chazi l'chi) are to portray that the excess amount is not considered a bonus (Aramaic tosefet kethuba) but the base amount (Aramaic ikkar kethuba). Likewise, Asher ben Jehiel explain that the full amount of 400 Zuz is collectible even in the even the original ketubah document is lost, and even if the larger 400 Zuz amount was not written in the ketubah, all this with the intent to publicize the importance of the daughters of Kohanim.

Shneur Zalman of Liadi stated that the marriage ceremony and feast a bat kohen to a non-kohen man is not considered a seudat mitzvah, since the marriage is one that may produce negative results.

The 400-Zuz ketubah was practiced during the amoraic period, but from then onward, no mention of the increased amount is found in rabbinic sources.

==== Justification ====
Jonathan of Lunel describes the excessive amount given the bat kohen as the rightful due to her and her family for keeping to the Torah laws and restrictions that apply to priestly families and keeping to the heritage (yukhsin) of priestly lineage. He rejects the notion that such excess would cause envy and jealousy from non-priestly families (who are not officially entitled to the excess amount).

Joseph ibn Habib justifies the excess amount by saying it is a greater shame for a kohen if his daughter is divorced, and the higher ketubah value discourages husbands from divorcing their bat-kohen wives.

=== Other ===
When a priest's daughter committed adultery, not only did she suffer the special penalty of burning (rather than strangulation), but her father was demoted from being honored with the sanctity afforded priests.

The bat-kohen receive lenient specifications in her preparations for immersion.

The firstborn of a daughter of a Kohen or Levite is not redeemed at thirty days.

One author has suggested that a bat-kohen should have priority in leading a women's zimmun just as a kohen does for a men's zimmun.

== In modern Judaism ==
In modern times, Orthodox and many Conservative rabbis maintain the position that only a man can act as a kohen, and that a daughter of a kohen is recognized as a bat kohen only in those limited ways that have been identified in the past. Accordingly, in Orthodox Judaism only men can perform the Priestly Blessing and receive the first aliyah during the public Torah reading, and women are generally not permitted to officiate in a Pidyon HaBen ceremony.

Similarly, the Conservative halakha committee in Israel has ruled that women do not receive such aliyot and cannot validly perform such functions, and many traditionalist Conservative synagogues have retained traditional gender roles and do not permit women to perform these roles at all.

Other Conservative rabbis, along with some Reform and Reconstructionist rabbis, are prepared to give equal kohen status to the daughter of a kohen. The US Conservative movement, consistent with the view that sacrifices in the Temple will not be restored and in light of many congregations' commitment to gender (but not caste) egalitarianism, interprets the Talmudic relevant passages to permit elimination of most distinctions between male and female kohanim in congregations that retain traditional tribal roles while modifying traditional gender roles. They base this leniency on the view that the kohen's privileges come not from offering Temple offerings but solely from lineal sanctity, and that ceremonies like the Priestly Blessing should evolve from their Temple-based origins. (The argument for women's involvement in the Priestly Blessing acknowledges that only male kohanim could perform this ritual in the days of the Temple, but that the ceremony is no longer rooted in Temple practice; its association with the Temple was by rabbinic decree; and rabbis therefore have the authority to permit the practice to evolve from its Temple-based roots). As a result, some Conservative synagogues permit a bat kohen to perform the Priestly Blessing and the Pidyon HaBen ceremony, and to receive the first aliyah during the Torah reading.

Many egalitarian-oriented Conservative synagogues have abolished traditional tribal roles and do not perform ceremonies involving kohanim (such as the Priestly Blessing or calling a kohen to the first aliyah). Most Reform and Reconstructionist temples have taken a similar position.

Some women's prayer groups that practice under the halakhic guidance of non-Orthodox rabbis, and which conduct Torah readings for women only, have adapted a custom of calling a bat kohen for the first aliyah and a bat levi for the second.

== In Kabbalah ==
Isaac Luria explains the negative aspect of a bat kohen not marrying a kohen from the Kabbalistic view, using gematria; that since the Hebrew letters K H N ( ה,נ,ך those that spell "kohen") do not have a match using the Ayak Becher formula, therefore it is best for a kohen to marry a kohen.

"Ayak Becher" formula
א	י	ק
ב	כ	ר
ג	ל	ש
ד	מ	ת
ה	נ	ך
ו	ס	מ
ז	ע	ן
ח	פ	ף
ט	צ	ץ

The formula, explains Luria, portrays that the such marriage between Kohanic families works nicely.

== In literature ==
The expectations upon the daughter of a Kohen feature in Julian Stryjkowski's Voices in the Darkness.

== See also ==
- Bat Levi
- Halakha given to Moses on Sinai
