= List of disqualifications for the Jewish priesthood =

Disqualifications for a Kohen to serve in the tabernacle or Temple in Jerusalem

Under the Law of Moses in Ancient Israel certain imperfections and other criteria could disqualify the priest from serving in the tabernacle or, later, the Temple in Jerusalem.

Many of these disqualifications are applied to the continuing role of the kohen in the Mishnah, Talmud and later rabbinical literature, as well as in some schools of modern Judaism.

== Hebrew Bible ==
=== Physical disqualifications ===
These blemishes include:

1. blindness
2. lameness
3. an excessively low nasal bridge (such that a straight brush could apply ointment to both eyes simultaneously)
4. disproportionate limbs
5. a crippled foot or hand
6. cataracts
7. a white streak that transverses the junction between sclera and iris
8. certain types of boils
9. crushed testicles

A Kohen who was afflicted with one of these imperfections would be deemed unfit for service. However, should it be a correctable imperfection, he would become re-eligible for service once the defect is corrected. Although unable to serve, he was permitted to eat of the Terumah (holy food). Kohanim with these blemishes would be allowed to perform work in the Temple outside of sacrificial service itself.

== Defilement by uncleanliness ==
Since the priests served a unique role of service amongst the nation of Israel, e.g. service in the Holy Temple and consumption of the Holy Terumah, so the Torah required them to follow unique rules of ritual purity, in order to protect them against ritual defilement (tumah). Some of these rules are still maintained today in Orthodox Judaism.

=== Defilement by contact with the dead ===
- Kohanim are forbidden to come in contact with dead bodies. They are permitted, however, to become defiled for their closest relatives: father, mother, brother, unmarried sister, and child. Defilement of a Kohen to his wife, although not biblically explicit, is permitted by Rabbinical order.
- A Kohen is forbidden to enter any house or enclosure, in which a dead body (or part therof), may be found (Leviticus 10:6, Leviticus 21:1–5, Ezekiel 44:20, Ezekiel 44:25) Practical examples of these prohibitions include: not entering a cemetery or attending a funeral; not being under the same roof (i.e. in a home or hospital) as a dismembered organ. The exact rules and regulations of defilement are quite complex, but a cursory rule of thumb is that they may not enter a room with a dead person or come within a few feet of the body. Proximity to the corpse of a non-Jew is less serious and may only be an issue if actual contact is established.

According to Orthodox Jewish practice, modern-day kohanim are obligated to guard against ritual defilement as prescribed by the Talmud. In order to protect them from coming into contact with or proximity to the dead, Orthodox cemeteries traditionally designate a burial ground for kohanim which is at a distance from the general burial ground, so that the sons of deceased kohanim can visit their fathers' graves without entering the cemetery. They are also careful not to be in a hospital, airplane, or any enclosed space where dead bodies are also present.

==== Exceptions to Tumah defilement ====
The Talmud prescribes that if a kohen, even the Kohen Gadol, chances upon a corpse by the wayside, and there is no one else in the area who can be called upon to bury it, then the Kohen himself must forgo the requirement to abstain from Tumah and perform the burial (Meis Mitzvah).

The Talmud also permits the Kohen to defile himself in the case of the death of a Nasi (Rabbinic leader of a religious academy). The Talmud relates that when Judah haNasi died, the Priestly laws forbidding defilement through contact with the dead were suspended for his burial ceremony.

=== Marital defilement ===
- A male Kohen may not marry a divorcee, a prostitute, or a dishonored woman (חללה) (Leviticus 21:7) A Kohen who enters into such a marriage loses the entitlements of his priestly status while in that marriage. The Kohen is not permitted to forgo his status and marry a woman prohibited to him (Leviticus 21:6–7). However, in the event that a Kohen transgresses a marital restriction, upon termination of the marriage the Kohen is allowed to re-assume his function and duties as a full Kohen.

Modern-day kohanim are also prohibited from marrying a divorcee (even their own divorced wife); a woman who has committed adultery, had been involved in incest, or had relations with a non-Jew; a convert; or the child of two converts. A born-Jewish woman who has had premarital relations may marry a kohen only if all of her partners were Jewish.

The daughter of a Jewish mother and non-Jewish father, while halakhically Jewish, is prohibited from marrying a kohen according to the Shulchan Aruch, reiterated by Rav Moshe Feinstein. Due to a small doubt about this in the Talmud (Yevamos 45A-B), if such a marriage is performed the couple would not have to get divorced, see Shulchan Aruch 4:19. The sons of such a union do remain Kohanim but there is a doubt as to whether they would be allowed to serve in the 3rd Temple. The London Beth Din will not perform such a marriage but allegedly U.S. and Israeli Modern Orthodox synagogues will.

- Talmudically, were a kohen to marry in disregard of the above prohibitions, his marriage would be effective. Children born of the union do not have mamzer status. However, these children, are termed Chalal ("disqualified") and do not possess Kohen status. However, the children born of the union of a Kohen married to the daughter of a non Jewish father are not disqualified, as the prohibition is considered a "Safek Pagum", (doubtful blemish).
- The high priest may marry a virgin only.

=== Other defilement ===
- During the period of the Tabernacle and Temple the priests were required to abstain from wine and all strong drink before and while performing their priestly duties (Leviticus 10:9, Ezekiel 44:21).

== Rabbinical commentary ==
According to Sefer Hachinuch, since the Temple was a place of beauty and the services that were held in it were designed to inspire visitors to thoughts of repentance and closeness to God, a less than physically perfect priest, and a less than perfect spiritual ambiance, would mar the atmosphere.

== See also ==
- The status quo Kohen
- The Mitzvah of sanctifying the Kohen
- The Torah instruction of the Kohanim

== Bibliography ==
- Mishnayoth: Seder Nashim. Translated and Annotated by Philip Blackman. Judaica Press Ltd., 2000. pp. 134–135
