= Chazakah =

Legal presumption in Jewish law

A chazakah (Hebrew: חֲזָקָה, romanized: ḥəzāqā, lit. 'presumption') is a legal presumption in halakha (Jewish law); it establishes burden of proof. There exist many such presumptions, for example, regarding the ownership of property, a person's status (e.g. whether they are a kohen or Levite), and presumptions about human behavior.

== Etymology ==
The Hebrew word חזקה is a noun form of the verb חזק, meaning (in this context) "take possession".

== Overview ==
The conceptional terminology is "default status," "agreed properties," or status quo of an object, land or person − usually when sufficient proof is missing or unavailable. The concept is relevant to many aspects of Talmudic law and halakha.

There are various ways how something can obtain the state of chazakah:

1. The previous known state, which may include but is not restricted to:
  1. In disputed ownership of articles, they would be left in the hands that hold them
  2. By disputed ownership of land, it would be left in the hands of the last certain owner (Hebrew: חזקת מרא קמא). The one who argues that he bought off that piece of land must prove it unless he has already owned that land for three years, in which case he is assumed to have the right of possession by chazakah..
  3. In Jewish dietary laws, every article is in its previous state (Hebrew: חזקת כשרות), before proven different.
2. The automatic acquisition of certain usage rights following three years of undisturbed usage (equivalent to usucaption in Roman law). After retaining a property for more than three years without protest from the previous owner, the party retaining the property is assumed to be the owner. The previous known owner assumes the burden of proof if he claims lawful title to the property, that is, he loses the chazakah that a previous known owner has on the property. This is because he did not protest against the party retaining the property for three years, which is construed as proof that he relinquished his ownership.
3. Rules based on common belief, since they are usually true, are called rov. A common example is the belief that most people don't pay their loans until they are due, so one cannot argue that he has already paid without further proof.
4. A real-estate transfer could be achieved by chazakah, which means that the new owner shows ownership by building on the property.

The various kinds of presumptions found scattered throughout the Talmud may be divided as follows: (1) presumptions of physical conditions (chazakah di-gufa); (2) presumptions arising from the fact of possession (chazakah di-mamona); (3) presumptions arising from the nature of humanity or certain actions and circumstances (chazakah mi-koach sebara).

A presumption was often established through the repetition of an incident several times. The most notable instance of this kind is that of the Goring Ox, which was regarded as a vicious animal (mu'ad) after it had committed the offense three times, according to Bava Kamma 23b. It was not permitted to marry a woman who had been twice divorced on account of barrenness, for she was presumed to be a barren woman according to Yevamot 64a, nor a woman whose two husbands died a natural death, for she was presumed to be a murderous woman (isha katlanit) according to Niddah 64a. Parents, two of whose children died at circumcision, need not circumcise their other children, for the presumption was established that their children could not stand the pain of circumcision according to Eruvin 97a. Simeon ben Gamaliel II opines that presumption may be established only after an incident has occurred three times in Yevamot 64b. (Note: Compare Yevamot 65a, Tosafot s.v. "VeShor" and "Niset"; Asheri, 6:14, where it is argued that Rabbi's ruling, as is shown by his decision in the case of the goring ox, does not differ from that of Simeon ben Gamaliel II insofar as monetary cases are concerned.)

No definite rule was laid down by the Jewish sages for guidance in cases where presumptions collide, where each party has some presumption in his favor. For example, A bought an object from B but had not paid the money; A desired to return it to B because he had found a defect that he claimed was in it before it was delivered to him. A had the presumption of possession (of the money), B the presumption that the defect was created while the object was in A's possession on whose premises it was found: the decision was in favor of B. (Note: Ketuvot 76a Mishneh Torah Mechirah 20:14; Hoshen Mishpat 124; compare Bava Batra 92a. In all such cases, the court had to decide which of the presumptions was stronger and render its decision accordingly.)

Even capital punishment could be inflicted based on a chazakah. Man and wife and children living together and treating one another as such are legally considered as one family, and illicit relationships between them would be punished with death on the strength of the presumption, even though the kinship could not be proved by legal evidence.

See Migo regarding the presumption that a man would not offer a false argument when he could produce a better one if he were willing to lie.

Presumptions are principles formed on a vast amount of judicial experience, by which the court is guided not only in settling the question as to which of the contending parties incurs the burden or responsibility of bringing proof of the assertions made in pleading but also in rendering a decision in doubtful cases. Although inferior to actual evidence and entirely disregarded when refuted by it, presumption was still a potent factor in Jewish law, and greatly influenced the decision of civil and capital cases.

=== Sources ===
According to one opinion in the Talmud, the principle of chazakah has a Biblical source in Leviticus 14:38, which discusses the case of tzaraat in a house. After the priest had examined the plague-sore and found it to be of a certain size, he locked the house for seven days, after which time another examination was made. "Is it not possible that while he was locking the door the plague-sore diminished in size? Since, however, Scripture takes no notice of this, it must be because it presumes that the plague remained in the state in which the priest first found it; Scripture teaches us here the principle of presumption". However, some of the amoraim rejected this derivation and instead held that chazakah is a Law given to Moses at Sinai. (Note: Compare Tosafot Chullin 10b; Maharsha ad loc.)

== Examples ==
=== Possession of land ===
The Talmud is a demonstration of land ownership, a chazakah of uncontested property usage for three years.

Mere possession was not sufficient to establish a title to real property. The presumption was that "real property is always in the possession of its owner" until evidence showed that he had sold it or had given it away. Since, however, people are not careful in preserving documentary evidence for more than three years, the Rabbis ordained that undisturbed possession for three consecutive years was sufficient to establish a claim to real estate. In the case of houses or of other buildings the possessor was required to produce evidence of continuous occupancy, either by himself or by a tenant holding a lease from him, for three full years "from day to day". In the case of fields or gardens, the prevailing opinion was that possession for three successive harvests of the same kind was sufficient, even when the last harvest had been gathered before the expiration of the three years.

"Possession not based on a valid claim is not regarded". If the possessor claimed that he had bought the land of its owner, or that it had been given to him, or that he had inherited it, possession for three years was sufficient. But if he said that he took possession of the property because there was no other claimant, possession even for many years was of no value. And if at any time during the three years the owner protested (meha'ah), either in the presence of the holder or before two witnesses, against the unlawful holding of his property, the fact of possession was of no value in establishing title to the property.

The following persons could not acquire property by usucaption: (1) a building contractor; (2) a partner; (3) a steward; (4) a husband his wife's in which he had the right of usufruct; (5) a father his son's, or (6) a son his father's; (7) a guardian his ward's; (8) a minor; (9) an idiot; (10) a deaf-mute (whose property, in turn, could not be acquired by others); (11) a robber. No argument of possession could be advanced to establish a title to the property of a fugitive who had fled in fear of his life, or to property belonging to a synagogue, or to communal charitable institutions.

=== Possession of movable property ===
Concerning movable property, the presumption was that it belonged to the possessor unless it was conclusively proved that he held it under false pretenses. Even if the owner brought evidence that the object belonged to him, the possessor was believed if he claimed that he had bought it or that he had received it as a gift, and he needed only to take the rabbinical oath (hesset) to establish his claim. Talmudic law distinguished, however, between objects that people are accustomed to lend or hire and objects that people are not accustomed to lend or hire; the mere claim of possession, even for many years, was not sufficient to establish a title to objects of the former class, and the owner could at any time establish a claim by producing witnesses to testify that they belonged to him; but the latter class of objects could be acquired by mere possession.

The maxim that anything in a man's possession is his did not apply to a mechanic whose occupation it was to repair the objects in question. Even if he had had an object in his possession for a long time, the owner could claim it on the ground that he had given it to him for repair.

Small cattle of the kind left in the open and allowed to move from place to place were excluded from the principle governing title by possession in movable property, for the supposition was that they had wandered onto other premises without their owner's knowledge. There is a difference of opinion among the later authorities as to whether three years of possession was sufficient to establish the right of property in them. Large cattle of the kind that are delivered to a shepherd and are always under his control, or infant slaves that are unable to walk were treated like other movable property. In contrast, adult slaves were considered in the same category as immovable property, and a continuous possession of three years was sufficient to establish title to them.

=== Easements ===
The Talmudic law applies the principle of chazakah also to easements or servitudes consisting in the right or privilege of using another's land without compensation. For example, if one causes one of the beams of his house to protrude into the premises of his neighbor, and the neighbor does not object immediately, the owner is regarded as having a chazakah in the servitude of his neighbor's premises as regards the beam. There are three distinct opinions among the later authorities regarding the nature of this ḥazaḳah. Some (the Geonim and Maimonides) think that the chazakah of easement need not be accompanied by a real claim, nor need it last for three successive years as is required with movable property. Others (Rabbeinu Tam, Yonah Gerondi, Shlomo ibn Aderet) hold that this case is in all respects similar to the case of immovable property, needing both a real claim and three years' possession. Others, again, adopt the compromise of Rashbam, who regards easements as immovable property in so far as they require a real claim to title, but with the difference that they do not require three years' possession to establish the right.

=== Personal status ===
The "status quo" kohen (Hebrew: כּוֹהֵן מַחְזֵק, romanized: kohen muḥzaq) is a rabbinic title which legitimates Kohen status one who—amongst multiple criteria—exhibits exemplary conduct and is recognized by his peers and community as such. Such conduct includes, but is not limited to, abstaining from corpse uncleanness, abstaining from forbidden marriages to a Kohen, administering the Priestly Blessing, redeeming the firstborn, and more.

The tanna Jose ben Halafta praised the soundness of this chazakah by labeling it a basis for the entire halakhic concept of chazakah. It is based on this chazakah that all poskim agree—unanimously—to forbid the status quo Kohen from marrying a divorcee.

Once a Kohen is established as a "status quo" kohen, it is a mitzvah to sanctify him and assist him in abstaining from the restriction that applies to a Kohen.

The chazakah of the Kohen is deemed valid and in good standing unless a valid objection to his lineage is made before a beth din. (Note: Mishna Ketubot (and Rambam thereof))

=== Various other presumptions ===
Other presumptions in halacha include:

- All flesh is presumed to have been cut from a living animal ("ever min ha-ḥay") and hence to be forbidden food until it has been determined that proper shechita was performed on the animal; hence an examination of the organs to be severed at slaughtering is necessary. After it is slaughtered it is presumed to be kosher until it is demonstrated how it became forbidden; hence no examination of the animal is necessary, except of those organs (such as the lungs) which contract a disease most readily.
- In cases involving money, the prevailing principle is אוקי ממונא בחזקת מריה ("leave the money in the possession of its master"). Hence the general principle in Jewish law, that the burden of proof is on the plaintiff. This principle has far-reaching results. It is followed not only where there is insufficient evidence to establish the truth, but also where there is contradictory evidence. If after a case has been decided in accordance with a presumption the plaintiff violently takes the object of contention from the defendant so that the presumption shall favor him, it is doubtful whether the former presumption becomes thus annihilated; and the later authorities differ as to which presumption to follow in such a case.

Many Talmudic presumptions are based on analysis of human nature. These include:

- No woman would have the audacity to declare in her husband's presence that she was divorced from him, if she were not.
- No man is presumed to have paid his debt before it was due.
- No one would be so shameless as to deny a debt in the presence of his creditor.
- A shaliah is presumed to fulfill his commission.
- The master is presumed to have paid the day-laborer at the end of his day's work.
- No man permits himself to be robbed without a struggle.
- A scholar would not issue any deed unless it had been correctly executed.
- A house is presumed to have been examined for chametz on the fourteenth of Nisan, and one hiring a house on that day need not examine it again.

== See also ==
- Usucaption
