= Dough offering =

Biblical injunction to separate a tithe from bread

Packer of Passover Shmurah Matzah at the "Boro Park Matzah bakery" performing the Mitzvah of separating Challah from each basket (called "צירוף סל" in Hebrew)

In Judaism, the dough offering (or separation of challah, Hebrew: הפרשת חלה) is a positive commandment requiring the owner of bread dough to give a part of the kneaded dough to a kohen (Jewish priest). The obligation to separate the dough offering (henceforth: challah) from the dough begins the moment the dough is kneaded, but may also be separated after the loaves are baked. This commandment is one of the twenty-four priestly gifts. By biblical law the commandment is only obligatory in the Land of Israel, but rabbinic law applies it also to bread made outside the Land of Israel.

The common modern practice in Orthodox Judaism is to burn (although simply throwing away the dough in a double-wrapped container is allowed) the portion to be given the Kohen, although giving the challah to a Kohen for consumption is permitted—even encouraged—outside Israel (permitted with restrictions, see article below for detail).

== Hebrew Bible ==
The offering is commanded in Numbers 15:17–21:

Speak to the sons of Israel and say to them, 'When you enter the land where I bring you, then it shall be, that when you eat of the food of the land, you shall lift up an offering to the Lord. Of the first of your dough you shall lift up a cake as an offering; as the offering of the threshing floor, so you shall lift it up. From the first of your dough you shall give to the Lord an offering throughout your generations.

In the above passage "cake" is hallah (Hebrew: חלה) while "of dough" is ʿarisah (עריסה).

The return of the Jews from the Babylonian exile marked a renewal in adherence to numerous commandments, and the dough offering, "the first fruits of our dough," is listed as one of them (Nehemiah 10:38).

== Rabbinic Judaism ==
The Mishnah and Jerusalem Talmud contain a tractate named Challah dealing with the dough offering. The halakhic codification of the mitzvah appears in Shulhan Arukh, Yoreh Deah 322 and Mishneh Torah Bikkurim 5:1.

=== Components of the mitzvah ===
The mitzvah of challah is one mitzvah with two parts: (1) separating the required dough (Hafrashat challah), (2) giving the dough to a Kohen (Netinat Challah). Nachmanides and the Tosafist Isaiah di Trani explain that it is the actual giving of the Challah portion to the Kohen that is the primary component of the Mitzvah.

=== Types of dough ===
Only the five species of grain require the separation of the dough offering: wheat, barley, spelt, wild barley (or oats), and rye. Challah and tithes may not be taken from dough made from "new" grain (chadash) on behalf of dough made from "old" grain (yashan).

Certain preparations of dough were exempt from the duty of separating the dough-offering, such as Sūfgenīn dough that was made with a thin-batter, variously mixed with spices or milk-products, and deep-fried in oil to be made into fritters. Included in this exemption is dough that has been kneaded with milk and honey to be deep-fried over a stove into honey-cakes (Hebrew: dūḇshanīn). Although exempt from the dough-offering, they still require the separation of regular tithes. The Jerusalem Talmud makes the exemption of separating the dough-offering contingent upon breadstuffs that have been cooked in a frying pan or pot over a stove, rather than baked in an oven. If these were baked as bread in an oven, they would still require the separation of the dough-offering. A quantity of dough equalling 1.6 kilogram or more which was prepared to make hardened biscuits (Hebrew: qanūḇqa’ot) requires the separation of the dough offering.

=== Quantities ===
The minimal quantity of dough whose preparation mandates the performance of the Mitzvah is quantified by Chazal as a portion of flour equivalent to 43 and 1/5 eggs, also known as one omer. In modern terms;

- The quantity that requires reciting a blessing is about 1.64 kg. (Some only recite a blessing if the quantity is above 2.25 kg.)
- A quantity of flour weighing between approximately 2 lb 11oz (1.23 kg) and 3 lb 11oz (1.666 kg) qualifies for giving Challah but no blessing is recited.

The Torah does not specify what quantity of dough must be given to the kohen. This is discussed in the Talmud; the rabbinical stipulation is that 1/24 is to be given in the case of private individuals, and 1/48 in the case of a commercial bakery.

If no separation is done while cooking, it can be done after baking without a blessing.

=== Consumption or burning ===
The consumption of Challah by a Kohen in the Land of Israel is forbidden by Torah law due to the absence of the ashes of the Red Heifer necessary for ritual purity.

With this in mind, the Tosefta, followed by the Rishonim, encouraged the act of separating "Challah" in order that the Mitzvah not be forgotten entirely, along with the full recitation of a blessing before the dough is separated. The blessing recited is "asher kiddeshanu bemitzvotav ve'tzivanu le'hafrish challah."

The common practice of Diaspora Jewry is to burn the Challah; home bakers fulfill this by tossing the Challah to the back of the oven. However, it is Halachically permitted in the Diaspora to give the separated Challah to a Kohen for consumption, and even encouraged by some Rabbinic authorities, with the provision that the Kohen has immersed in a Mikvah. The Kohen is also required to recite the required Beracha thanking God for sanctifying the Kohanim with the sanctity of Aharon. In Yemen, whenever baking a quantity of dough which required the separation of the dough-offering, one small loaf of flatbread was removed from the batch and designated as Challah and burnt, while another small loaf of flatbread from the same batch, being non-consecrated bread, was given to a small child of the priestly stock and eaten by him, so that the practice of giving the Challah would not be forgotten amongst Israel.

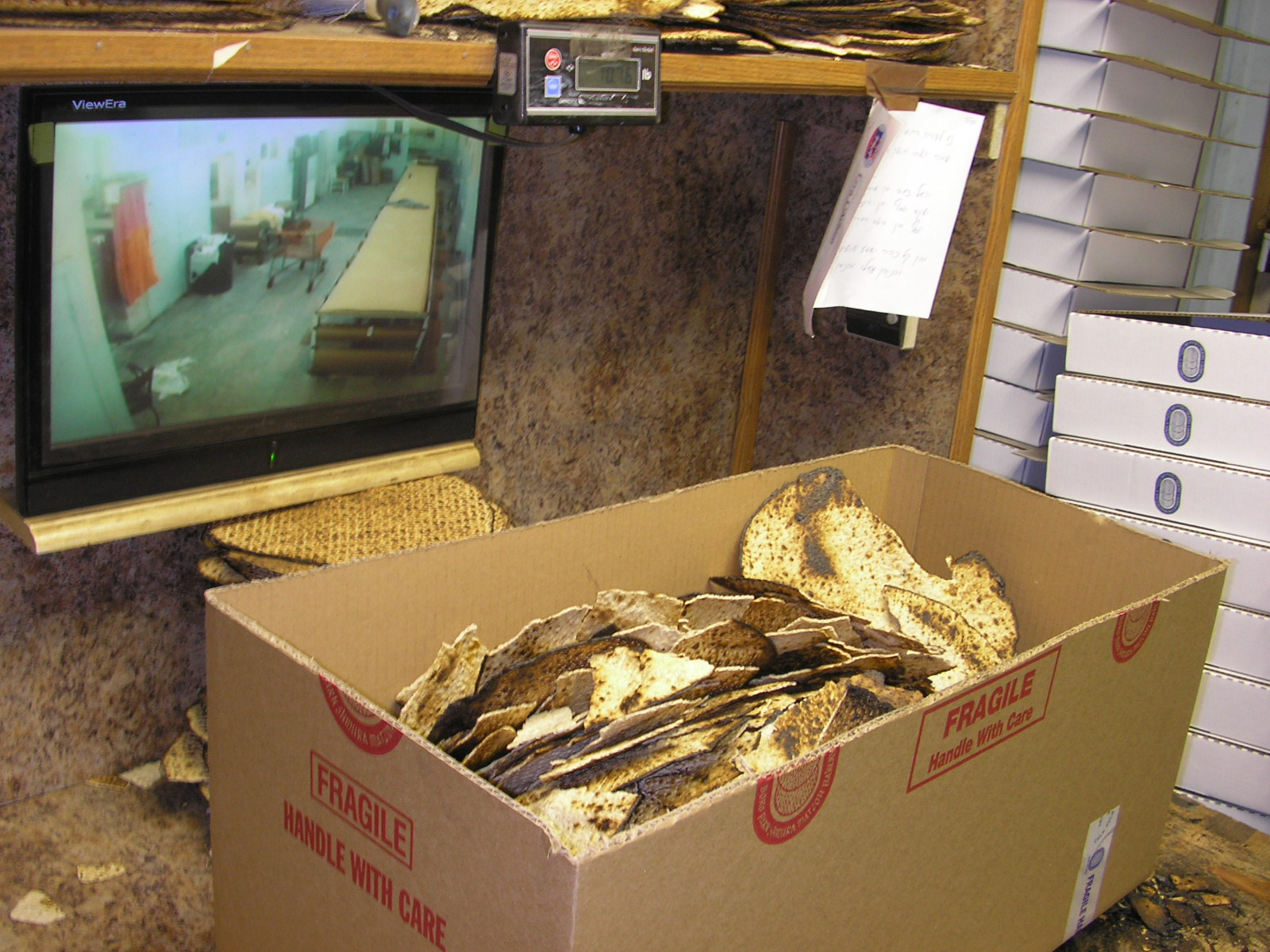
Overview of complete box of daily Challah yield at Boro Park Shmurah Matzah Bakery. Paper hanging at right is a request for the packer to pray for sick individuals as he performs the Mitzvah of separating the Challah from each basket.

The commentators to the Shulchan Aruch record that it is the custom of some Diaspora Jews to give Challah (in this case fully baked Passover matzah) from the dough used for baking "Matzot Mitzvah" (the Shmurah Matzah eaten during Passover) to a Kohen minor to eat.

=== Other laws ===
The requirement to separate Challah from the dough was imposed on the owner of the dough, not on the person who kneaded it; hence if the owner was not Jewish, even if the kneader was, Hafrashat Challah was not mandatory. The requirement does not apply to bread prepared as animal feed.

The requirement applies in Israel even during the Shmittah (Sabbatical) year. Even the pauper who is entitled to collect Peah and would be exempt from giving Ma'aser (Tithe) is obligated to give Challah from his dough portion. The dough from Maaser Sheni is likewise not exempt from Challah giving.

=== Interpretations ===
Challah, as one of the twenty-four kohanic gifts, was a means of sustenance for the kohanim, who, because of their expected full-time involvement with Temple duties and Torah instruction, were not intended to have land or income derived from it, unlike the other tribes of Israel (although this was often not the case during the Second Temple era).

The mitzvah of separating challah is traditionally regarded as one of the three Mitzvot performed especially by women.

Obadiah ben Jacob Sforno reasons that God wished to negate the negative effect of the sin of The Twelve Spies by establishing this Mitzvah in order that bracha ("divine blessing") should rest in the homes and on the dough products of the Jews.

In Shlomo HaKohain of Greece's kabbalistic commentary on the Zohar, the performing of this commandment by women, who traditionally did the cooking, uplifts the dough from a state of tevel (spiritual non-readiness) and brings it to a state of khullin (mundane and permitted to its owner), thereby correcting the action of Eve who gave of the forbidden fruit to her husband.

The Jerusalem Talmud implies that the commandment was given before the sin of the Twelve Spies, even though it is recorded (immediately) afterwards.

== See also ==
- Presumption of priestly descent
