= The mitzvah of sanctifying the Kohen =

Jewish commandment based in the Hebrew Bible

The commandment to sanctify the progeny of Aaron (Hebrew: מצוות קידוש זרעו של אהרן) is a commandment based in the Hebrew Bible, and developed in rabbinical teaching that requires believers in Judaism to sanctify their priests (kohanim) in various ways. These include assisting him to abstain from any prohibitions in the Law that apply to him, and by affording him first rights in areas relating to holiness and the service of God. In the enumeration of Maimonides this is the 32nd positive commandment of the Law.

In Hebrew the commandment is literally known as the mitzvah of sanctifying the "seed of Aaron" (Hebrew: מצוות קידוש זרעו של אהרן).

== Hebrew Bible ==
At the time of the Jewish Exodus from Egypt, the sacrificial activity of the Jewish nation was conducted by the firstborn of Israel. After the sin of the Golden calf, God recounted the privilege of priesthood from the firstborn and gave it to Aaron, and his sons, as an everlasting priestly covenant.

Generally, the duties of Kehuna are not restricted to sacrificial offerings alone but include various other forms of service to the nation of Israel. These forms of service include Torah instruction and managing tzaraath.

Along with the commandment that God commanded Moses to confer the priesthood to Aaron came along the commandment which involves the participation of the nation of Israel in maintaining and creating a state of holiness and sanctification of their priests. Examples of this sanctification include assisting the priest in abstaining from forbidden marriages, to maintain a general state of purity, and to furnish the priest with gifts (later in rabbinical sources, counted as Twenty-four priestly gifts) to carry out his required duties.

The inauguration of Aaron and his sons to perform the holy service in the tabernacle is related in Exodus and Leviticus:

And Aaron and his sons I will sanctify to serve me. And I will dwell amidst the children of Israel and I will be to them for a God.
And you should sanctify him since the bread of your God he sacrifices. Holy he should be to you, since holy I am the God who makes you holy.

== In Rabbinical commentary ==
According to the Sifsei Kohen to the Chumash since the priest or kohen is chosen by God to perform direct service to God, doing acts of sanctification to and honoring the Kohen demonstrate the sanctification of God himself in a practical setting. In a somewhat radical explanation Abraham ibn Ezra contends that the personality traits of the priest, given to him by God, are superior to those of the rest of the nation of Israel. Hence, the power to administer the priestly blessing and to be successful at prayer rests with the Kohen, thereby justifying preferential treatment from amongst the nation.

The Talmud understands "you shall make holy" to refer to sanctifying the Kohen in all matters of Kedushah:

The school of Rabbi Yishmael taught: "you shall make holy" refers to all matters of holiness: to open first (at addressing a gathering), to bless first (at Birchat HaMazon), and to take a fine portion first.

=== Addressing a crowd ===
As part of the school of Rabbi Yismael's explanation, the Mitzvah includes sanctifying the Kohen with the first slot in delivering Torah instruction from amongst other Jews who are on the/a panel of speakers. Rabbinic authorities explain that this sanctification is only applicable in the event where the Kohen is greater or equal in Torah knowledge to the other Jews present. In the event that he is not greater in Torah knowledge, this first slot is afforded the Rabbi who is superior.

=== The kohen giving grace after meal ===
The Kohen is given the honor to initiate grace after the meal provided three adult male Jews have dined together. The Kohen may allow a non-Kohen to initiate the blessing instead, but his permission must be explicit. Rashi interprets the requirement to sanctify the kohen at mealtime as affording him the initiation of making the Bracha of HaMotzi at the start of the meal.

=== Priority to the choicest portion ===
With two honors being interpreted by the school of Rabbi Yishmael to mean spiritual forms of honor, the third is interpreted as a physical one; here, the requirement is to give the Kohen the first choice when choosing portions of equal size and value.

=== The first Aliyah ===
When the Torah reading is performed in synagogue, it is customary to honor the kohen for the first reading (aliyah), and a Levite for the second reading (if a kohen and Levite are present in synagogue). The third reading, and any later readings (on Shabbat and holidays), are given to individuals who are not kohanim or Levites.

Nowadays, this practice is followed in Orthodox synagogues and some Conservative synagogues. Reform and Reconstructionist Judaism have abolished special ritual roles for kohanim and Levites.

== See also ==
- The status quo Kohen
- shoulder, cheeks and maw (as an outside-of-Israel priestly gift)
