= Breira =

Breira may refer to:

- Breira, Algeria
- Breira (organization), a 1970s Jewish organization
- Breira (Talmudic doctrine), a Talmudic doctrine
