= Herem (priestly gift) =

Jewish ceremonial gift dedicated to God

In the Tanakh, the term herem (Hebrew חֵרֶם ḥêrem) is used, among other meanings, for an object or real property to be devoted to God, with God authorizing a kohen (Jewish priest) to be its receiving agent.

This law is one of the twenty-four kohanic gifts and, of those twenty-four, as one of ten gifts given to the priest even outside the land of Israel.

According to Abba Jose ben Hanan, the nuances of the herem laws (as well as laws of hekdesh and arakhin, and five other categories of laws) are considered "eight pillars of Torah law" that are "principles of Halakha".

== Etymology ==
In Hebrew the adjective herem (Hebrew חֵרֶם) means "devoted thing" or "thing devoted to destruction". The term is used 29 times in the Masoretic Text of the Tanakh. An unrelated homonym, the noun herem meaning "fisherman's net" (also חֵרֶם), is used a further 9 times. The adjective herem and the associate verb haram ("devote") come from the Semitic root Ḥ-R-M, with cognates in the Syriac and Arabic languages.

The word "devoted" (herem) is understood by Maimonides as a "complete and total transition" from one status to another. The Targums define the word as a complete separation. According to Samuel ben Meir, this is the complete transition of an estate or object from hullin (mundane) status to that of kodesh (holy).

== Sources ==
The first of two sources of the commandment is stated in Leviticus:

Notwithstanding no devoted thing, that a man shall devote unto the LORD of all that he hath, both of man and beast, and of the field of his possession, shall be sold or redeemed: every devoted thing [is] most holy unto the LORD.

— Leviticus 27:28, KJV

A second source, however, explicitly instructs that the devoted thing be given to the priest;

Every thing devoted in Israel shall be thine.

— Numbers 18:14

To reconcile the seemingly incompatible instructions in the Biblical verses, the Tosefta explains them as detailing two types of devoted things: hermei gavoah (devoted things specifically consecrated by their owner to the Temple in Jerusalem) and hermei kohanim (devoted things to be given the priest, as the estate or object was not designated by its owner to the Temple in Jerusalem).

=== "Devoted property" in the territory of Joseph ===
Malbim, a 19th-century Bible commentator, explained Joshua 24:33 as referring to the practice of herem. According to him, the tribe of Joseph desired the merit that Eleazar the high priest should be buried in their territory. Thus, when he died they designated Givat Pinchas (modern Awarta) as a herem estate; that is to be given the priests currently in duty as per the priestly divisions), and calculated to publicize the herem designation during the division cycle when Pinchas was in service, thus increasing the likelihood of Pinchas burying his father in the herem property, which ultimately happened.

== Ideas behind the commandment ==
The Sifra describes the commandment to devote things as enabling the Israelite to perform a commandment with objects that otherwise do not have a commandment attached to them, e.g. a non-kosher animal other than the firstborn of a donkey; by way of the Israelite making his possession thereof herem he elevates it to holiness.

Maimonides describes the act of creating a "devoted" estate a worthy act, since it goes against the sin of miserhood. In addition, he also categorizes the initiation of devoted goods by an Israelite as an act of respect and honor to the God of Israel.

Raya Mehemna (a conversation between Moses and Elijah found as an addition to the Zohar) describes herem as rectifying and healing the negative emotion of anger the initiator of a devotion of property may possess.

The Sifre argues that the priests' right to herem is a reward for Jochebed (mother of Aaron, the first priest) for rescuing the infants of Israel from the pharaonic decree of infanticide of Israelite newborns:

"And Kotz gave birth to Onuv and to HaTzovevah and the families (of) Acharcheil the son of Harum" - "son/child of Harum" refers to Jochebed, as it is written: "All herem in Israel shall be yours"

— Sifre to Numbers 10:29

== Rabbinic laws ==
=== Undesignated herem ===
Opinions differ as to what is done with herem in cases where the initiator of herem did not designate whether the property is consecrated to the Temple or to the priests (stam herem). Maimonides opines that this undesignated herem be given the priests by default. Maimonides further states that undesignated devoted property is considered mundane (hullin) and may be used by the priests for personal needs. This is in contrast to the case where the person does designate his herem to be given the priests, in which case the herem retains a holy (kodesh) state and cannot be used for personal needs.

=== Dispension to the mishmaroth ===
Allocation of herem may depend on the type of the object devoted; whether it is real estate or goods. According to Rav Sheshet, devotion of real estate is considered one of the four priestly gifts that is divided among the serving priestly division (mishmar kehuna), while tangible devoted goods are appropriated even to an individual priest not currently in active Temple service.

== In modern times ==
The herem commandment, although practice infrequently today, still has halakhic implication in modern times:

=== In the diaspora ===
Considering that herem is listed as one of the ten priestly gifts that can be given to a priest outside of Jerusalem (similar to the Pidyon HaBen and the giving of the shoulder, cheeks and maw), some poskim have noted that both types of devoted things, both real estate and goods, are designated and given to the priest of the beit din's choice.

Solomon Luria is of the opinion that the dedicator of herem is required to specify that the property be given to a priest, in order for a priest to be eligible as the recipient. In terms of the beit din choosing an eligible priest, Rabbi Luria opines that the status quo Kohen is sufficient to be the recipient of a devoted item and it to be "mundane" (hullin).
