= Arakhin =

Talmudic tractate

Arakhin (Hebrew: עֲרָכִין, romanized: ʿarāḵin, lit. 'valuations') is the fifth tractate in Kodashim in the Talmud. It deals mostly with the details of the laws in Leviticus 27:2–29 in Rabbinic Judaism.

== Chapters ==
Chapters 1–6 are based on Leviticus 27:1–8 and deal with the vows of donating one's prescribed value as part of the dedication to the Temple in Jerusalem as well as other gifts to the treasury of the Temple. Chapters 7-8 explain the redemption from the Temple of an inherited field according to Leviticus 27:16–25. Chapter 8 addresses the herem, one of the twenty-four priestly gifts, according to Leviticus 27:28–29, while the last chapter deals with the laws of ancestral fields and houses in walled cities and how they are redeemed according to Leviticus 25:25–34.
