= Foreleg of ox =

Egyptian hieroglyph

F24
Thigh-foreleg of ox
in hieroglyphs

F24 F23
Normal – (Reversed)
"meat" vs "strength"
in hieroglyphs

The Foreleg of ox hieroglyph of ancient Egypt is a hieroglyph; it is the nighttime constellation Ursa Major called as Maskheti constellation. It came to have many uses in ancient Egypt over its entire history.

== Iconographic usage ==
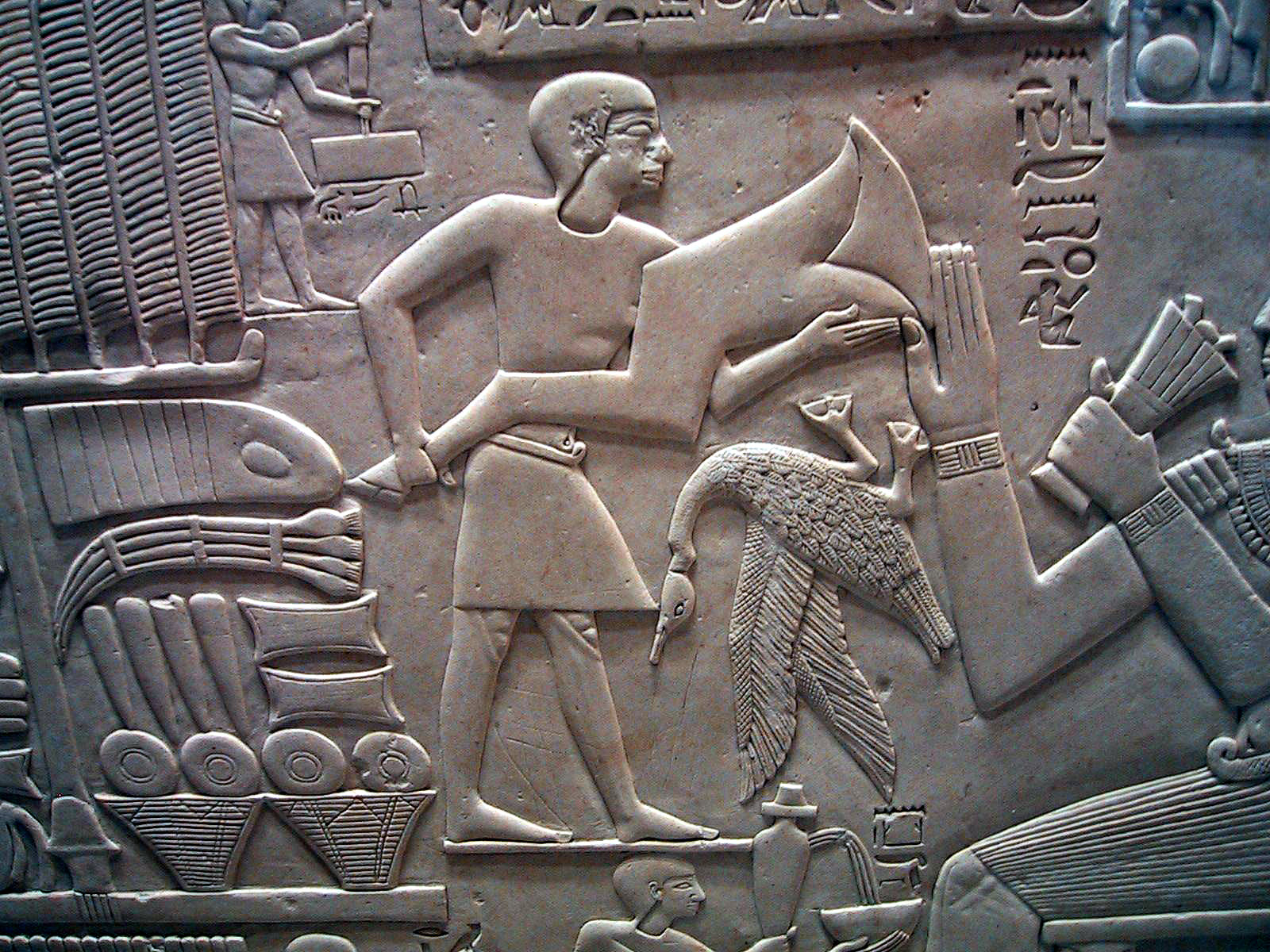
Foreleg being offered, thigh first, as the 'choicest meat of ox'

=== Offered as "thigh-forward", "meat" ===
One of the major iconographic uses in ancient Egypt of the ox-foreleg was as part of the food offering to the individual being honored (the deceased or living), and engraved upon their steles. Often, besides lying on the top of the pile of food offerings, it is shown being presented to the honored individual, thigh first.

=== Offered as "hoof-forward", "strength" ===
Iconographically used as the symbolism of strength, power, dominion.

== List of uses ==
A list of uses for the foreleg hieroglyph, with no order of importance actually implied:

- Foreleg of ox, "a choice cut of meat".
- Mortuary offering for ritual; the first item shown in the formulaic listing of items given to the deceased on the funerary stele (thigh, then fowl, bread, wine, beer, and linen, etc.).
- In ritual ceremony, the right and left forelegs of oxen are always "unfettered" while incapacitating the oxen and are the sacrificed forelegs.
- Ideogram, or determinative–
  "thigh", "arm"
  'khopesh' , (h)pš).
- The "strong (human) arm", the strength implied by royal or divine gift.
- for "strength" (khopesh) in dedication ceremonies such as the Opening of the Mouth; also before mummy interment.
- The foreleg-thigh shape is equivalent to the power implied from the similar-shaped scimitar presented by deities.
- "The Foreleg of Ox" as Ursa Major constellation.

=== Rosetta Stone ===
Though the Foreleg of ox hieroglyph is not used in the Rosetta Stone directly, the strength (khepesh) of the scimitar is. In line R-6: "... and a statue of the god Osiris of the city Alexandria, giving to him, pharaoh Ptolemy V Epiphanes, a 'royal sword' (khopesh nesu) of victory"; the word khepesh uses the scimitar hieroglyph as the determinative. The quote is part of the ten rewards to be given to Pharaoh Ptolemy V in the Rosetta Stone.

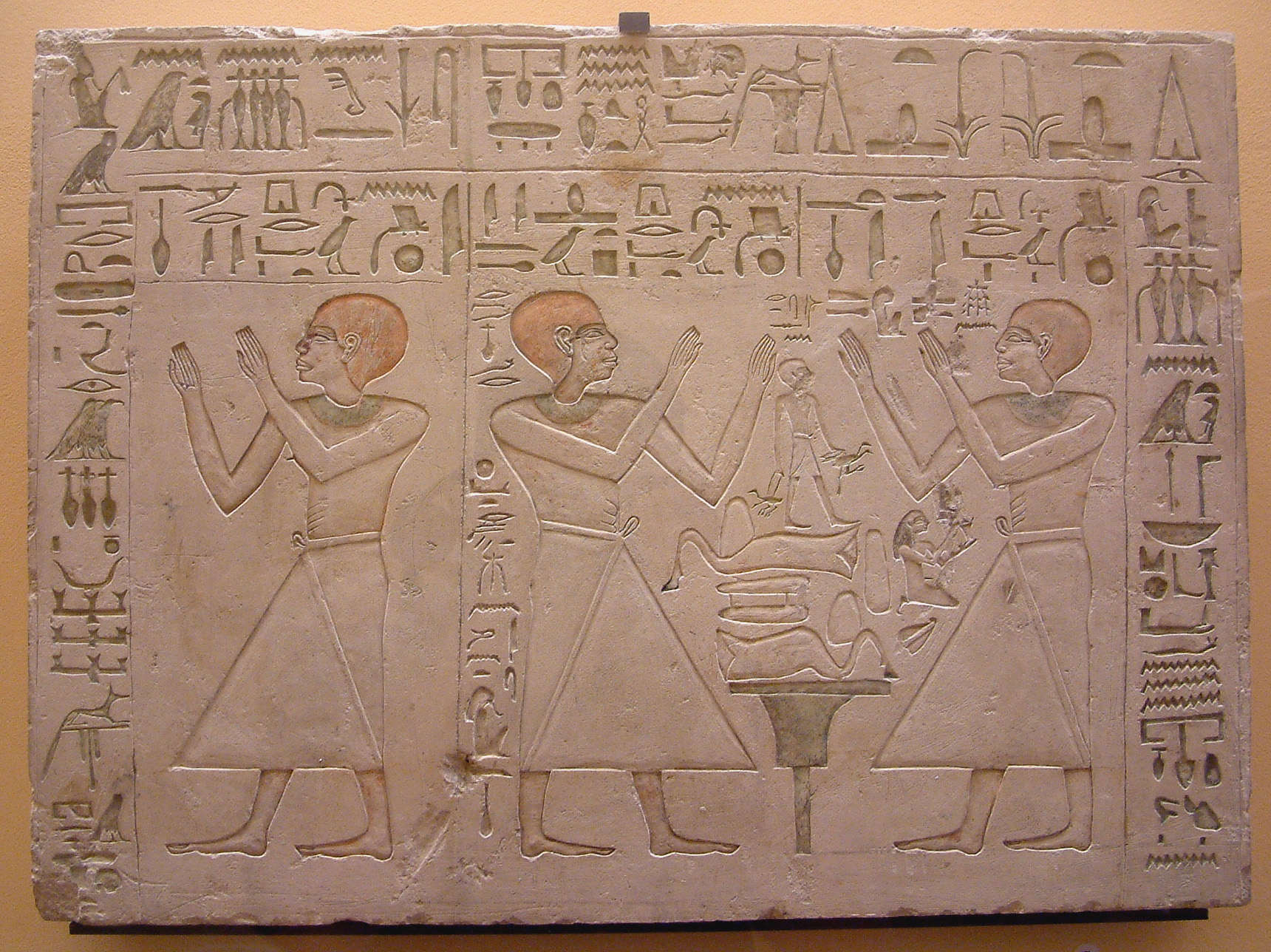
Foreleg of ox (2) on offering table

== See also ==
- Gardiner's Sign List#F. Parts of Mammals (F23 and F24)
- List of Egyptian hieroglyphs
- Foreleg, cheeks and maw in Deuteronomy
