= The Torah instruction of the Kohanim =

Instructions for priests in the Torah

In Judaism, the instructions of the priests (Hebrew: תורת כהנים torat kohanim) are the rulings and teachings of the priests that are addressed to the Jewish people. Numerous Biblical passages attest to the role of the priests in teaching Torah to the people and in issuing judgment. Later rabbinic statements elaborate on these roles. However, the priest's religious authority is not automatic: even a mamzer who is a scholar takes precedence over an ignorant Kohen Gadol.

The term torat kohanim is also used specifically as a title for the book of Leviticus, or for the Sifra (a work of halakhic midrash to Leviticus).

== Hebrew Bible ==
The first instance where the Hebrew Bible gives command to instruct the Israelites is found in Leviticus;

And the LORD spoke unto Aaron, saying:... that ye may teach the children of Israel all the statutes which the LORD hath spoken unto them by the hand of Moses.

The Sifra and Talmud Bavli interpret this verse to include not only the items listed but also directs the kohen to be involved with instruction in various other areas of Torah law: arakhin, priestly gifts, cleanliness, general Torah instruction, midrash, halacha, and proper reading of the Torah.

In Leviticus 27:14 priests are given the power to evaluate the value of holy gifts (arakhin). Deuteronomy 21:5 says of the priests that "according to their word shall every controversy and every stroke be". Deuteronomy 17:9 provides for the referral of a particularly difficult legal case to "the Levite priests, or the judge who will be present in those days". In Deuteronomy 31:9 the priests are entrusted with care of the Torah scroll. Deuteronomy 33:10 lists teaching God's laws as a core task of the tribe of Levi (to which the priests belong).

=== In Neviim and Ketuvim ===
In Malachi 2:7 the priest is assumed to be well versed and knowledgeable in Torah law and to be in a perpetual state of teaching those laws to the nation. He is also involved in displaying ("proving") the qualities of the Torah and the value of living its lifestyle. Rashi explains that Jehoshaphat sent a combined delegation of priests and officers (2 Chronicles 17:8) so that the priests could teach while the officers would enforce the teachings.

In 2 Chronicles 15:3, the presence of a "teaching priest" among the people was a sign of God's connection to them.

In Psalms 132:9 the priests are described as "clothed in righteousness" due to their role as teachers and judges.

== In rabbinic sources ==
The Talmud says that priests are presumed to be knowledgeable (bnei deah) regarding the Torah, while members of the tribe of Levi (to which priests belong) can frequently give halakhic instruction even in their youth.

Priests had the ability to differentiate between niddah and zivah.

Targum Jonathan describes a Temple visit as an opportunity to learn from the rebuke of the "priests and sages".

According to Eliyahu Bakshi-Doron, the priest's jurisdiction extends not only to tzaraath (as specified in Deuteronomy 24:8) but also to financial disputes.

Seforno argues that the priests, due to their experience as judges, were experts at understanding human behavior and criminology.

In the Midrash, the unusual knowledge of the kohanim was attributed to their consumption of Terumah. Why this food consumption had this specific effect is a matter of rabbinic debate. One opinion is that due to receiving terumah the kohanim did not need to engage in business and therefore had the mind to devote to Torah study and instruction. Another opinion is that the actual food itself, being of kodesh quality brought increased spiritual capacity to its kohen consumer.

Rabbinic sources describe the Priestly court which functioned at the Temple in Jerusalem, and held jurisdiction over various matters related to the Temple service and the priesthood.

According to Obadiah ben Abraham, the instruction of the High Priest carried as much weight as that of the entire Sanhedrin.

A rabbinic teaching likens a priest who speaks Torah to an angel (see Malachi 2:7), and a priest who fails to speak Torah to an animal.

=== Levi and Aaron ===
Maimonides states that Jacob separated his son Levi from his brothers and ordered him to study, and teach, the ways of service to God of his forefather Abraham to his brothers, and that Jacob also instructed his sons to perpetuate this order of Levi for eternity. Tanhuma writes that the sons of Levi were overly generous in their Torah instruction and succeeded at instructing their neighboring tribes to the point where they too became reliable Torah instructors.

A midrash states that Amram, father of Aaron, was the spiritual leader of the Israelites during their Egyptian slavery. After his death, this leadership role was assumed by his son Aaron. Aaron, as the spiritual leader of the Israelites during their bondage in Egypt, and likewise after the arrival of Moses and their ultimate redemption, was known to the nation as its instructor, a man of kindness, and as a peacemaker amongst arguing parties.

=== Modern views ===
Rabbi Samson Raphael Hirsch explains this responsibility as not being the exclusive Torah instructors, but working in tandem with the rabbinic leaders of the era, while other rabbinic greats – notably the Chasam Sofer and Maharitz Chayes – acknowledged a unique assignment of torah instruction to the descendants of Aaron.

== In the Zohar and Kabbalah ==
In Kabbalah it is expounded that the kohen functioning in Torah guidance should be unusually knowledgeable in Torah law, and should act humbly and kindly, even though being in an authoritative position.

In the Zohar the ideal kohen is described as the epitome of the knowledgeable man and as being reliable in activities involving Kedusha (holiness). In the "Zohar Chadash" Rabbi Yochanan is quoted as saying that the Kehuna goes in tandem with Torah study and isolation. By contrast, the Zohar Chadash later goes on to describe the kohen's Torah knowledge as being involved with the Korban (sacrificial offering) and its respective owner -as a part of the greater nation of Israel- as a central role in the Korban service. Amongst the detail of note in terms of the kohen's involvement is the requirement that he be experienced in having "Kavana" (mental intent) of the holy name of Yahweh during his servicial involvement.

In the expunges of the Zohar it recorded that the placing of the blood from the first sacrifice (in Hebrew: ail ha"miluim") offered in the Mishkan as placed on Ahron and his son's right ear cartilage had an eternal effect that their ear be receptive in internalizing Torahic concepts, and to have the ability to intertwine the written and Oral Torah's into one entity.

The Tanna Rabbi Yitzchok notes that it is the kohen who accomplishes the "Nichoach" (the relaxing result of the sacrifice) -namely, the pleasure of God himself, it is therefore necessary that the kohen be knowledgeable in Torah even more than the average Jew.

The Kabbalistic work Raziel HaMalach describes the kohen as teaching Torah to the people and due to participation of the masses a divine blessing for material sustenance is given. Alternatively, lack of participation leads to the opposite effect.

=== In Chabad literature ===
Chabad literature delivers an in depth view of the unique divine character traits of the tribe of Levi in general and of the priests in particular. Beginning from Shneur Zalman of Liadi, the "Alter Rebbe," who at length described the unique kindness attribute of Aaron and also the divine wisdom given to the priests (kohanim) in all generations inclusive of kohanim who are merely youth.

Dovber Schneuri, "the Mitteler Rebbe," describes the instructive attributes of the priests and modern kohanim, even at greater length than his father and predecessor, in terms of all divine intellect of the Torah being drawn down by way of the Torah study and instruction of the kohanim. He also explained the Temple menorah lighting and incense offering of the priests as symbolic of the ability of the priests to produce joy and pleasure in the "attribute of wisdom" ("מדת החכמה"), which brings the Jewish nation an increase in material sustenance - even in times of exile when the Temple service is not being performed.

== See also ==
- 613 commandments
- Law given to Moses at Sinai
