= Joseph ibn Habib =

Spanish Talmudist

Joseph ibn Habiba (Hebrew: יוסף חביבא), also known as Joseph Haviva and Nimmukei Yosef, after the title of his book, was a Spanish Talmudist who flourished in the 14th and 15th centuries. He lived in Barcelona.

== Nimmukei Yosef ==
Like his predecessor, R. Nissim ben Reuben (RaN), Ibn Ḥabib wrote a commentary on the halachot of Isaac Alfasi, entitled Nimmuḳei Yosef, published with the text and the commentary of R. Nissim (Constantinople, 1509). Against the opinion of David Conforte that Ibn Ḥabib wrote commentaries only upon those tractates which R. Nissim had omitted, Azulai proved that Ibn Ḥabib's Nimmuḳei Yosef covered the entire halachot of Isaac Alfasi, but a part of it had remained unpublished, and that the commentary to the halachot of Moed Katan and Makkot, attributed to R. Nissim, belongs to Ibn Ḥabib. The latter quotes Asher ben Jehiel, Ritva, his master RaM, and R. Nissim himself. Nimmuḳei Yosef on Ketubot and Nedarim was also included in the work Ishei Adonai (Leghorn, 1795), and the portion on Shebuot in the Bet ha-Beḥirah (ib. 1795). Azulai says that Ibn Ḥabib was the author of novellæ on the whole Talmud.
