= Priestly covenant =

Covenant granting Aaron's line priesthood

According to Judaism, the priestly covenant (Hebrew: ברית הכהונה, romanized: Brit ha-Kehunah) is the biblical covenant that God gave to Aaron and his descendants, the kohanim. This covenant consisted of their exclusive right to serve in the Temple, and to consume sacrificial offerings and receive other priestly gifts.

== The covenant with Aaron ==
In the Torah, the covenant is called "a covenant of salt forever" (with salt symbolizing permanence due to its use as a preservative) and "a statute forever".

In midrash, the priestly covenant is one of five everlasting covenants, and can never be taken from Aaron and his descendants. The priesthood is one of five items that God calls "to me" (Hebrew לי), a term that connotes an eternal choice, as God himself is eternal.

Practically speaking, the Torah forbids non-Aaronides from offering the Ketoret offering on the inner altar, approaching the altar or the Holy of Holies, or receiving the twenty-four priestly gifts.

Pinchas, who was a grandson of Aaron, received a separate "covenant of eternal priesthood" following his act of zealotry. This covenant has been interpreted in various ways; for example, that his descendants would be high priests and not just regular priests, or that he did not become a priest until this moment (because the initial covenant was with Aaron and his sons and their descendants born after that moment, but not with Pinchas who was born before that moment).

== Pre-Israelite priesthood ==
The first person named in the Hebrew Bible as a "priest" (Hebrew kohen) is Melchizedek.

According to Leviticus Rabbah, God initially intended for the priesthood to permanently remain with Melchizedek's patrilineal descendants. But when Melchizedek chose to bless Abraham before blessing God, God transferred the priesthood to Abraham's descendants. Chaim ibn Attar stated that the transfer was not a punishment (since Abram was rightfully deemed worthy of precedence for independently coming to recognize God in a pagan world); rather, Melchizedek willingly gave the priesthood to Abraham upon recognizing his outstanding uniqueness and Godly character traits.

== Pre-Aaron priesthood ==
According to rabbinic sources, prior to the appointing of Aaron and his sons, the priestly role was filled by the firstborn (bechor) of each household. Abraham passed on the right of priesthood to his son Isaac, who in turn passed it on to his son Jacob. Even Esau, the firstborn of Isaac, served as priest, until Jacob acquired the birthright from him, at which point Jacob began to serve.

According to Maimonides, Jacob appointed his son Levi as a leader in order to teach the ways of God to the family, and instructed his other sons that there should always be one Levite appointed as leader, to perpetuate the religious tradition. According to midrash, Jacob chose to tithe his sons, and Levi was the tenth to be counted. According to midrash, Amram the son of Kohath the son of Levi was the spiritual leader of the sons of Jacob during their Egyptian Bondage. Following his death, his post was assumed by his firstborn Aaron.

Kli Yekar writes that the priesthood was taken from Reuben due to his sinning against his father Jacob. However, according to the Targum to Books of Chronicles, individuals from the Tribe of Reuben (the firstborn of Jacob) served as High priest, until Aaron received the role after the golden calf.

After the Exodus, God commanded that firstborns be dedicated to God, though it is not explicitly stated that this is for priestly service. Similarly, according to the midrash, sacrifices were initially offered by firstborns at Mount Sinai. According to Ibn Ezra, the firstborns also offered sacrifices to the golden calf, leading directly to the loss of their priestly privileges.

== Choice of Aaron ==
In the initial command to erect the Tabernacle, God commanded Moses to appoint Aaron and his sons to the priestly service; this appointment was a precondition to God "dwelling" amongst the nation of Israel.

=== Golden Calf ===
From Deuteronomy 10:8 it appears that the selection of the Levites occurred in conjunction with the sin of the golden calf. While some commentaries see the command for this selection as having predated the golden calf, many sources see the selection as resulting from the golden calf, as follows.

According to the biblical narrative, God initially intended to annihilate the entire people as punishment for the sin of the golden calf. However, the successful prayer of Moses, and the retribution meted out by the Levites to the sinners, appeased the anger of God. Nevertheless, one of the punishments that remained was the removal of the priestly role from the firstborns. Sforno writes that Moses attempted to convince God that the priesthood should remain with the firstborn, but was not successful.

While the golden calf sin (Exodus 32) is recorded later than the selection of Aaron (Exodus 28), according to Rashi these chapters are out of chronological order.

According to Nachmanides and other Torah commentators, the decision to appoint Aaron and his sons to priestly duty was a unilateral act of God, without agreement being asked of the people. This decision was not readily accepted, and a rebellion by Korah and several leaders of the tribe of Reuben later ensued. So powerful was the rebellion that even after the divine punishment of Korah and his followers, others came forth who further demonstrated disagreement and likewise met with divine retribution until saved by Aaron himself, who arrested the plague.

Based on the Talmudic rule that "when God gives goodness it is not later retracted" it is explained that God never granted the priesthood to firstborns, but rather humans decided to appoint firstborns to this role; thus God could eliminate this role and instead grant it to Aaron's descendants.

Moses served as a priest alongside Aaron when the Tabernacle was first erected, but this status did not transfer to Moses' offspring.

=== Reasons for choosing Aaron ===
Jewish commentaries on the Bible give various reasons to the logic behind the divine choice of Aharon and his sons for the priesthood.

Bekhor Shor explained that it was the desire of God that the priesthood rest with one specific family in order that the father of the household instill in his children the duties of the priesthood, and have his children exposed to those ideas, as a family way of life, from birth and throughout life, in order to be successful at their priestly duties. This not being the case with the firstborn (as each family could produce only one firstborn), as it is likely that the father of the firstborn not be a firstborn himself, making his knowledge of priesthood minimal and thus not being able to teach priesthood to his child.

David Pardo explained that selectively choosing one group of servants to the King (God) demonstrates the grandeur of the King, by showing that not all could merely "show up" and begin serving.

The midrash attributes the choosing of Aaron due to the meritorious actions of Jochebed, who saved the male Jewish infants from the infanticide decree laid forth by Pharaoh. From a kabbalistic perspective, some commentators explain the priesthood as belonging to Aaron from the six days of creation.

Sforno comments that one of the reasons for God's choosing of the tribe of Levi in general for public Temple service was to serve as a reminder of sin of the Golden Calf.

== Future priesthood ==
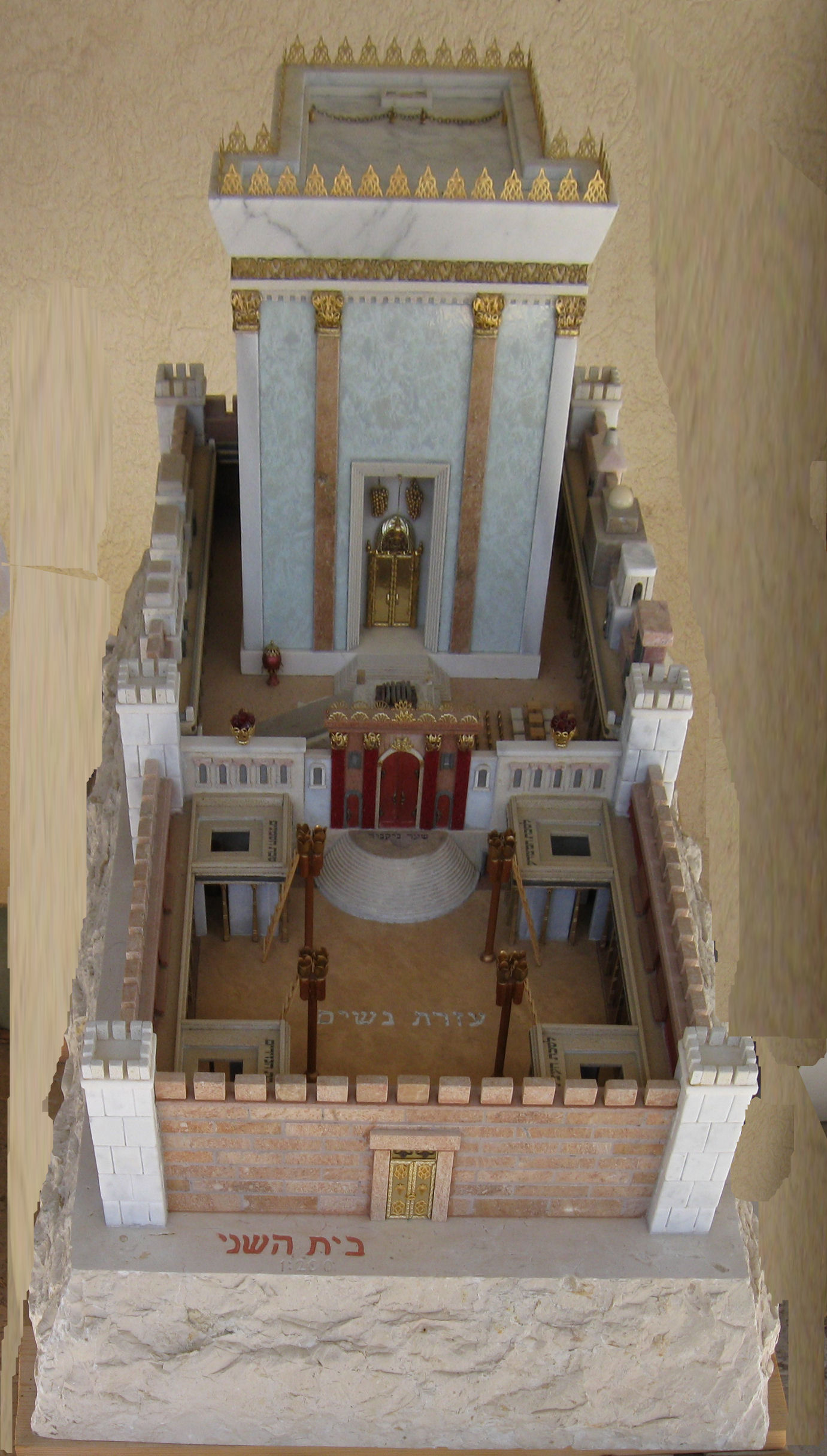
Model of the Second Temple with a view of the "Heichal" (The central tall structure)

After the destruction of the First Temple, at which point the Davidic monarchy and the Levite Temple service ceased, the idea spread that God had broken his covenants with David and the Levites. In reply, Jeremiah prophesied in God's name that these covenants would never be broken.

Ezekiel prophesized that a single priestly family - the descendants of Zadok - would perform the future Temple services, as this family had remained loyal to God even when the rest of the Jewish people had strayed.

Malachi prophesied of God purifying the Levites, in order that their sacrificial service be accepted.

Jacob ben Asher writes that Aaron and his sons will continue to serve even in the Messianic age. The Babylonian Talmud argues that Aaron himself will personally accept terumah when he is resurrected in the messianic era; Sifra teaches that he will not require holy anointing oil at this point, as he was already anointed in his first life. The Tosefta narrates that Aaron's rod was concealed along with the Ark of the Covenant, symbolizing the flowering of Aaron's priesthood once the Ark will be revealed.

=== Future firstborn service ===
According to midrash, just as the priestly covenant with Aaron is considered eternal, so to is the covenant with the firstborns eternal. Similarly, Leviticus Rabbah states that the firstborn retain some sanctity forever, despite the golden calf sin. According to Etz Yosef, this sanctity refers to the requirement that they be redeemed. According to Elazar Shach, it means that the firstborn is expected to be especially knowledgeable about Torah and diligent in Torah study.

The idea of continued firstborn status is expanded upon in various kabbalistic texts. Arizal was quoted as saying that in the messianic era, the souls belonging to the spiritual rootsource of Cain, which are essentially the souls of the firstborn and Levites, will become purified and will thus merit to serve in the Third Temple. This idea is exegesized from the phrase "if you do well, you will be uplifted" (Genesis 4:7). This idea is echoed by the first and third Lubavitch Rebbes. The second Lubavitcher Rebbe expressed the same idea but elsewhere expresses the standard idea. Chaim ibn Attar wrote that the firstborn will work alongside the Levites, who will not lose their Levite status. According to Ithamar HaKohen, in the Age to Come the sin of the Golden Calf will be rectified, allowing the firstborn to work alongside the priests. According to Jonathan Eybeschutz, the priests descending from Zadok will function as high priests, and the firstborn will function as standard priests. Various opinions have been proposed about which service the firstborn will do, whether they will receive terumah or maaser, and other implications of their future status.

To reconcile this idea with the standard halakhic texts which presume perpetual Aaronic priesthood, Menachem Schneerson (the seventh Lubavitch Rebbe) argued that the future change as presented in Hasidic Judaism and Kabbalah will appear purely on a spiritual level, with the soul of the Levi (i.e. those souls stemming from the rootsource of Cain) being born into the physical bodies of the sons of Aaron. Thus, individuals with the spiritual qualities of Levites will serve, though they will still be descended from Aaron.
