= Twenty-four priestly gifts =

Enumeration of gifts to Jewish priests

In Judaism, the twenty-four priestly gifts are an enumeration of the various gifts which halakha requires to be given to Jewish priests (kohanim).

These gifts were considered compensation for their service in the Temple in Jerusalem. The majority of these gifts were food items. Of these twenty-four gifts, ten gifts were given to the priests in the Temple, four were to be consumed by the priests in Jerusalem, and ten were to be given to the priests outside the land of Israel.

Most of the gifts are not given today, because there is no Temple. For example, most practicing Jews today do not give first-born of their animals to modern Kohanim. Other practices may be followed, such as selling the mother animal to a non-Jew before it gives birth to the firstborn, and then buying back both the mother and the firstborn.

== Gifts ==
According to the Tosefta, ten 'gifts' which were to be given to the Kohanim within the Temple area were portions of:

1. an animal brought as a sin offering
2. guilt offering
3. sacrifices of the communal peace offering
4. a bird brought as a sin offering
5. the suspensive guilt offering (asham talui)
6. the olive oil offering of a metzora
7. the two loaves of bread (shtei halechem) brought on Shavuot
8. the showbread
9. the left-over portion of the meal offering
10. the left-over portion of grain from the omer offering

Four further gifts to be given (or to be consumed) within the confines of the walls of Jerusalem were:

11. firstborn of any domestic kosher animal
12. Bikkurim (First-fruits)
13. the inner organs of certain offerings, that which is removed from the Nazirite offering
14. the skins of certain offerings

Ten gifts which might be given (or consumed) outside of Jerusalem were:

15. Terumah gedolah
16. Terumat hamaaser – a tithe of the Levite's tithe
17. Challah (Dough offering)
18. the first shearing of the sheep
19. foreleg, cheeks and maw of all non-sanctified, ritually slaughtered domestic animals
20. money given to redeem a firstborn son (Pidyon haben)
21. money (or a sheep or goat) redeemed in place of a firstborn donkey (Petter chamor)
22. property declared herem (dedicated to the Temple) without specifying to which use it is to be given
23. inherited fields that were dedicated to the Temple and not reclaimed in the Jubilee year
24. recovered property, which was stolen from a convert who then died without leaving heirs

Females, who did not serve in the Tabernacle or the Temple, were permitted to consume and/or benefit from some of the twenty-four priestly gifts. But if a priest's daughter married a non-priest, she was no longer permitted to benefit from the priestly gifts. Conversely, the daughter of a non-priest who married a priest took on the same rights as an unmarried daughter of a priest.

== See also ==
- Presumption of priestly descent
- 24 Priestly divisions
