= Presumption of priestly descent =

Presumption in Judaism

In Judaism, the presumption of priestly descent is the presumption that a Jewish man is a priest (kohen), based not on genealogical records of descent from Aaron or on Jewish court rulings, but rather by observation of his priestly behavior as recognized by his peers and community. Such an individual is called a kohen muhzak (presumed kohen or status-quo kohen; Hebrew: כהן מוחזק, from חזק).

The criteria for this determination are described in rabbinical halakhic texts. In the Land of Israel the criteria consisted of performing the Priestly Blessing and receiving terumah at the threshing floor, while in Syria and Babylonia the Priestly Blessing constituted adequate grounds without receiving terumah. Other criteria might include observing the priestly laws about impurity and forbidden marriages, or receiving the first aliyah in synagogue.

Rabbi Jose ben Halafta extolled the soundness of this "presumption" (chazakah) by calling it a basis for the entire halakhic concept of chazakah. It is based on this presumption that all poskim agree to forbid presumptive kohanim from marrying a divorcee. Among the Acharonim, this presumption described as "a sound presumption".

== Proof by documents and witnesses ==
The later books of the Bible describe the use of lineage documents to prove priestly descent, along with other recordings of lineage.

The Talmud gives little information regarding the content and form of the lineage document, in contrast to other Rabbinic documents that are described in greater length (for example the Ketubah, Get, business documents (Shtarei Kinyan), and the document of freedom for a bondsman (Shtar Shichrur)).

Rashi mentions that when the Israelites were required to ascertain their lineage to join their respective tribe, this document was brought in tandem with the testimony of witnesses.

Yair Bacharach noted that the lineage document was not commonly used by kohanim. He argues that the testimony of two Kosher witnesses regarding a kohen's lineage makes him eligible for service. Similarly, the Tur states that two witnesses are sufficient to qualify a kohen for service on the Mizbeach. According to the Avodah Tamma, either a lineage document or the testimony of two witnesses was sufficient.

The Mishnah states that during the Temple era, the Sanhedrin would rule on priestly status, while the Sifri says that the priestly court was responsible.

With the destruction of the Second Temple and the exile, hard-copy lineage recording was lost. In its place, kohanic legitimacy was determined based on the presumption, as well as the absence of a disqualifying objection by two witnesses in Beit Din.

== The presumption ==
Upon the return of Jews from the Babylonian exile, and the rebuilding of the Temple in Jerusalem, it became necessary to determine which individuals were actually valid kohanim (descended from Aaron in a direct paternal line, and not descended from the marriage of a kohen to a divorcee or similar forbidden marriages). Thus, Nehemiah conducted the first recorded investigation into the authenticity of apparently legitimate kohanim:

Of the priests: the sons of Hobaiah, the sons of Hakkoz, the sons of Barzillai, who took a wife of the daughters of Barzillai, the Gileadite, and was named after them. These searched among their ancestral registration, but it could not be located; therefore they were considered unclean and excluded from the priesthood. The governor said to them that they should not eat from the most holy things until a priest arose with Urim and Thummim.

At first glance, it would appear from these verses that the mentioned families were excluded from all priestly duties and privileges. However, Rabbi Yossi concluded from the phrase "most holy things" that they were still permitted to consume simply holy things, due to the presumption of priesthood implied by their previous priestly behavior. The Talmud debates whether or not a history of eating terumah from outside the Holy Land creates a presumption allowing terumah from the Land of Israel (which is forbidden to non-kohanim by a stronger prohibition, biblical rather than rabbinic); but both opinions accept that the presumption allows the individual to continue eating rabbinic-level terumah. To summarize: according to Rabbi Yossi, a close reading of the disqualification narrative reveals that the family actually remained qualified to perform certain priestly actions based on their historical behavior.

The rabbis discuss exactly which disqualification might be possessed by this family. The author of Avodah Tamma asserts that they were known to be descended from Aaron, but the suspicion was that one of their ancestors had engaged in a forbidden marriage, and thus disqualified from the priesthood as challalim. The Talmud Yerushalmi explains that Barzilai himself was a Jew, but his daughters were born non-Jewish and converted to Judaism before being three years of age, making their marriage to kohanim forbidden by rabbinic law. Since the suspected priestly disqualification was only rabbinic, at the conclusion of the investigation this family was permitted to consume terumah.

== Rulings affirming the presumption ==
According to Maimonides, once one is established as a presumptive kohen, the commandment to sanctify the kohen applies to him, and one should assist him in avoiding the priestly prohibitions. Maimonides considered this presumption to be in force unless a valid objection to his lineage is made before a Beit Din.

== Responsum of Isaac ben Sheshet ==
The source of questioning the legitimacy of kohanim is a single responsum of Isaac ben Sheshet, ("Rivash", 1328–1408). In this case, an individual publicly humiliated a kohen. Ben Sheshet was queried whether the humiliator should receive an increased monetary fine, since the humiliated was a kohen. Rabbi Yitzchok responded that "Although it is halacha that he who humiliates another by use of words is not liable, one who embarrasses a Kohen should be publicly rebuked and subject to request forgiveness from and to appease the Kohen — so long as the Kohen exhibits conduct expected from a son of Aaron". He then rejected increasing the penalty in this particular case, since the embarrassed kohen was not a learned kohen, but an unschooled am ha-aretz kohen. Ben Sheshet explained that such a kohen is not entitled to the kohen's extra honor, even if his priestly lineage was verified, and "all the more so today's kohen who possess no lineage document".

Isaac ben Sheshet's words "today's Kohen who cannot produce his lineage document", written as a sidebar explanation to his final ruling of standard compensation, over time evolved into an underpinning foundation for Poskim who sought to approve rabbinically-questionable marriages to a kohen.

Leading Rabbinic authorities, such as Joseph Trani and Samuel Ashkenazi, disputed reliance on the Isaac ben Sheshet's response for purpose of questioning the authenticity of the kohen. Among other proofs, they cited another response from Isaac ben Sheshet himself ruling that a kohen who married a divorcee must cease his marriage, proving that Isaac ben Sheshet fundamentally upheld the legitimacy of the presumptive kohen.

=== Rabbi Samuel de Medina's permission ===
Rabbi Samuel de Medina, in a response concerning a woman who was held captive as a young girl, ruled that a kohen is permitted to marry her. The logic, he explained, is one of a double uncertainty. One uncertainty being whether the woman was in fact raped as a captive, which if true would disqualify the woman from marrying a kohen (though only according to rabbinical decision due to her young age when captive). The second uncertainty is whether modern kohanim are authentic, based on the response of the Isaac ben Sheshet.

This responsum of Samuel de Medina was met with a fiery reply from Ezekiel Katzenellenbogen:

I have seen in some responsa and have also heard (about) a few Rabbi's who seek to be lenient regarding today's kohen and label them as "uncertain", I forbid myself from agreeing with them. Since they were already rebuked with one hundred (lashes from) metal-tipped whips from the hands of reputable rabbis making the issue forgotten to expose a falsehood on the authenticity of the Kohanim..let me not be with those responsa, not even as a sidebar to their opinion.

Rabbinic authorities such as Joseph Trani came to the defense of Samuel de Medina, stating that the case brought before his court was one of Rabbinic law, and that he would not have permitted it were the prohibition in question to be biblical. As proof they cite another responsa of Samuel's, where he prohibits a presumptive kohen from remaining married after her possible but not certain receipt of a bill of divorce.

=== Opinion of Solomon Luria ===
The opinion of Solomon Luria is somewhat obscure. On the one hand, he argues that herem intended for priests (whether land or goods), as well as shoulder, cheeks and maw, should be given to a presumptive kohen. However, he also legitimizes the questioning of priests' legitimacy following the Khmelnytsky Uprising, writing that this and similar upheavals utterly confused the lineage tracking of persecuted European Jews.

Luria quotes a story in which Hai Gaon would travel to Jerusalem for Sukkot and circle the Temple Mount with hundreds of kohanim in the company of Elijah the Prophet. One year, a student of his noticed him laughing during the procession. Asked why, Hai Gaon responded that Elijah revealed to him that, of the hundreds of kohanim that accompanied him in a haughty way, none were legitimate kohanim, except for one kohen who proceeded humbly. Although Luria described this story as "known among the works of Rabbinic leaders", it was generally unfamiliar at the time. The story was eventually traced by scholars to the Parma manuscript of Sefer Chasidim, a manuscript with multiple textual differences to the common edition of "Sefer Chasidim." However, the story is anachronistic in erroneously portraying Hai Gaon and Evyathar Kohen-Tzedek as contemporaries, while some scholars have labeled the story as a Karaite forgery. Others maintain that the story aligns with Hai Gaon's letter to the priests of Djerba, where he says that humility is a proper virtue of the kohen, and an arrogant kohen is of questionable priestly lineage.

=== Opposition to Luria ===
Luria's Talmudic explanation that put a damper on the legitimacy of Jewish priests was not readily accepted amongst some scholars. Some cited Luria's reasoning as "a feeble enough reason", while others validated Luria's reasoning solely outside of Israel. Some even went so far as to legitimize Luria's reasoning only to disqualify Ashkenazic priesthood while stating that Sephardic priesthood is of superior quality. The Chatam Sofer rejected Luria's reasoning that the lineage of Ashkenazic priesthood was utterly confused.

=== Opinion of Jacob Emden ===
In the ceremony of Pidyon HaBen, five silver coins are given to the kohen. Jacob Emden wrote that the status of a presumptive kohen is insufficient to merit actually keeping those coins. He suggested the kohen agree to a conditional transaction, with the intent on returning the coins to the father of the firstborn, in order to skirt the potential prohibition of theft on the kohen's part.

Numerous Poskim disagreed with Emden on this issue. For example, Chatam Sofer wrote that such a conditional transaction would invalidate the redemption, and the child would not be halachically redeemed so long as any pressure is exerted on the kohen to agree to this type of conditional transaction. A more extreme approach was taken by Chaim Hezekiah Medini who exclaimed, amongst a group of arguments, that Emden's advice created a cloud of uncertainty and doubt as to the otherwise legitimate lineage of the modern kohen. Medini concluded that the Emden's idea should not be relied on for the actual redemption of the firstborn.

In another responsum, Emden wrote that it is possible to find a kohen possessing a lineage document as far back as his priestly division, even though other Jews have no lineage documents at all.

== Table of Halakhic opinions ==
Rabbinic Authority	The legitimacy of the modern kohen
Maimonides	Kohanim in our time are priests by presumption.. they are permitted to consume.. the holy food of the diaspora
Jacob Weil	Those that are accustomed to baking their matzot on the second night (of Yom Tov).. should make a batch.. after baking (it).. he should make the "Lehafrish Challah" blessing.. but should not carry the challah after he separates (the part to be given to the Kohen) even though there is a juvenile Kohen in the city, since (they/we) are not accustomed to giving the Challah to a juvenile Kohen.. the reasoning—in my opinion—is that we are concerned that the part given to the Kohen will crumble apart—and will cause problems (of Chometz) or perhaps since (they/we) are not established—in our times—of a Kohen for certain.. and on Chol HaMoed, he should burn the challah.
Moses ben Joseph di Trani (the Elder) (The "Mabi"t"	Min HaTorah whomever has a Chazaka as being of the sons of Ahron is a Kohen in all aspects—since we stone and burn based on presumption as the potency of presumption is established oral tradition as we learn from the house with mildew and he does consume terumah and challah—as the Torah permits. and he (also) does service on the Mizbeach in the times of the Temple since he has a Chazaka as being of the seed of Aharon.. based on this Chazaka the Sanhedrin would allow him to serve. It appears to me that even in our time, whomever is of a family that has a Chazaka of being Kohanim and no objection was made (before beit din), is (considered) a Kohen in all aspects. As this chazaka benefits him—as per the law of the Torah. ..those Kohanim of Ezra.. since their chazaka was questionable being their lineage was attributed to the sons of Barzilai—who was an Israelite. However, whomever has that Chazaka of their family being Kohanim—and no objection was made—.. even in our time—from the Torah—are benefitted from it (their Chazaka).. even for Torah-based actions—as we plainly rely on it (their Chazaka) for Pidyon Bechor
Moses Isserles	we give Terumah (Gedola) to the Kohen—even if he is not Meyuchas (has his lineage document)—only "Muchzak"
Joseph Trani	*it is common amongst the masses to say to the kohen "bring a proof that you are a kohen and take (the twenty-four kohanic gifts)".. this is a mistake, since the Kohen and Levi are established by Chazaka.. regarding his tithe (that is) proper to give him since we are required to give it to avoid theft of their tribe (Gezel HaShevet), ..additionally.. we say.. all families (of Israel) have the Chazaka of being kosher (as legitimately Jewish).. and the Kohen.. is established with his Chazaka (to be a legitimate Kohen).. we give the gift of the foreleg cheeks and abomasum to the Kohen and we do not require him to produce proof of his linieage.: men of jest who scoff the establishment—those who dig deep away from God to destroy (his) idea and with the intent of desecrating the sanctity of Aaron.. those that (claim to) root themselves in matters of Halacha and state that the Kohanim of our time do not have a Chazaka.. let there be no doubt.. since the Kohen is established as thus he is believed more than a hundred (Kosher) witnesses
Shabbatai ben Meir HaKohen (1621–1662)	It is customary to give the Challah portion of the (Passover) Matzah to a juvenile Kohen
Magen Avraham	One should be careful with this (i.e. The Mitzvah of sanctifying the Kohen), since it is midioraita. Perhaps, though, some are not scrupulous since we are not knowledgeable in the lineage of the Kehuna
Ahron Orlaya	Rabbi Ahron expressed surprise at the Magen Avraham for casting doubt as to the authenticity of Kohanic lineage
Yair Bacharach	* In truth, we forbid a Shvuya (a woman who was held captive)' ..and one should not object to this (this forbidding)..since the Kohen reads first in the synagogue and reckons himself as a Kohen, his status is that of a Kohen. ..since he places himself in a state of restraint. his status (as an authentic Kohen) does not cross into the boundary of uncertainty: I question,... those that understood the Rivash..(as saying) that the Kohen of today is in a status of uncertainty (as to his lineage), since although they do not have their lineage tree nonetheless we stone.. based on Chazaka. And know, even aside for that, also in the days of the Talmud—aside for a select few—they did not have it (their lineage information) as is written, "I do not know if i stem from Reuven.."; It is strange in my eyes to differentiate between today's Kohen and the Kohen of prior generations (to say they are any less qualified)
Alexander Shur	This Chazaka (of the Kohen) is unlike all other Chazaka's in the Talmud.. essentially (this type of chazaka is) it is not acceptable to change something which we permit into something we forbid without a clear proof (to do so). (for example) something that a man is holding onto and he has a Chazaka of it indeed being his, we do not remove from his possession without a clear reason to do so—just as we do not withdraw money from its possessor who has a Chazaka on it (the money).
Moses Sofer	For the commandment of redemption of the firstborn, we rely that the Kohen is (a Kohen) for certain and (is) completely legitimate (for example) something that a man is holding onto and he has a Chazaka of it indeed being his, we do not remove from his possession without a clear reason to do so—just as we do not withdraw money from its possessor who has a Chazaka on it (the money).
Yechiel HaLevi	It is evil to me this action that i see some great leaders that wrote in their responsa that the Kohen of our time is not a certain Kohen—and they rely on these words of the Rambam. It is blasphemous to say that, and by (saying) it creates multiple problems, ..the intention of the Rambam is that modern Kohen (after the destruction of the temple) has the Chazaka of being a Kohen—meaning, they have the Chazaka of being a complete Kohen without question.
Chaim Hezekiah Medini	..The final line of all the above is that the opinion of many Latter Rabbi's agree halachically and practically that—the main ruling is—the Kohanim of today are for certain (Kohanim). They are in their state of Holiness (Kedusha) and Chazaka for all matters of the laws of Kehuna.
The Achiezer	
The Chazon Ish	
The Shem Aryeh	

== See also ==
- 613 commandments
- Y-chromosomal Aaron
