= Breira (Talmudic doctrine) =

Doctrine in Talmudic law, development of the law of joint property

Breira or Bererah (translation: "clarification" or "choice") is a doctrine in Talmudic law serving as a development of the law of joint property, and its validity is the subject of dispute among Talmudic authorities. According to the doctrine of breira, subsequent decisions can under certain circumstances be retroactively applied to change or clarify the nature and Jewish-law consequences of prior events. English law has the same concept, known as "relation back". The concept was known to the later Babylonian Amoraim.

Talmudic authorities disputed whether the doctrine of breira is a valid Jewish-law doctrine, and they also disputed its applicability to various particular circumstances. Subsequent commentators continued to dispute the doctrine's scope.

The concept has most often been found to be relevant when it is legally significant that a decision be made regarding a circumstance within a specific time period. If intent regarding the decision was not established prior to the deadline, but actions or events that occur after the expiration of the time period clarify the circumstances, the doctrine of breira would allow one to proceed as though the decision had been made in a timely manner. It has typically found to be inapplicable when the time to make the decision is infinite or indefinite.

== Examples ==
=== Creating multiple Eruvei Techumin on Shabbat ===
Generally, an eruv techumin (proxy dwelling that allows a person to walk farther than 2,000 amot outside his city of residence on Shabbat) must be established prior to twilight on Friday. Each person is ordinarily limited to one such eruv. However, under the doctrine of Breira, a person who is unsure of the direction of travel during a coming Shabbat may set up two eruvin in opposite directions. The next day, when it becomes clear in which direction the individual needs to travel, he may travel in that direction using that eruv, invalidating the other eruv. Under the doctrine of Breira, the intent to travel in this direction applies retroactively.

== Talmudic disputes over Breira's validity ==
=== Eruvin 36b ===
From Eruvin 36b-37a, it appears as though the Tanna Rabbi Meir recognizes the existence of Breira as valid, while Rabbi Yosi and Rabbi Shimon do not. Whether Rabbi Yehuda recognizes Breira is the subject of a Talmudic dispute.
