= Foreleg, cheeks and maw =

Gift of a kosher-slaughtered animal to a kohen

Halakhic texts relating to this article
- Torah: Deuteronomy 18:3
- Mishnah: Chullin 10:1
- Babylonian Talmud: Bekhorot 27a

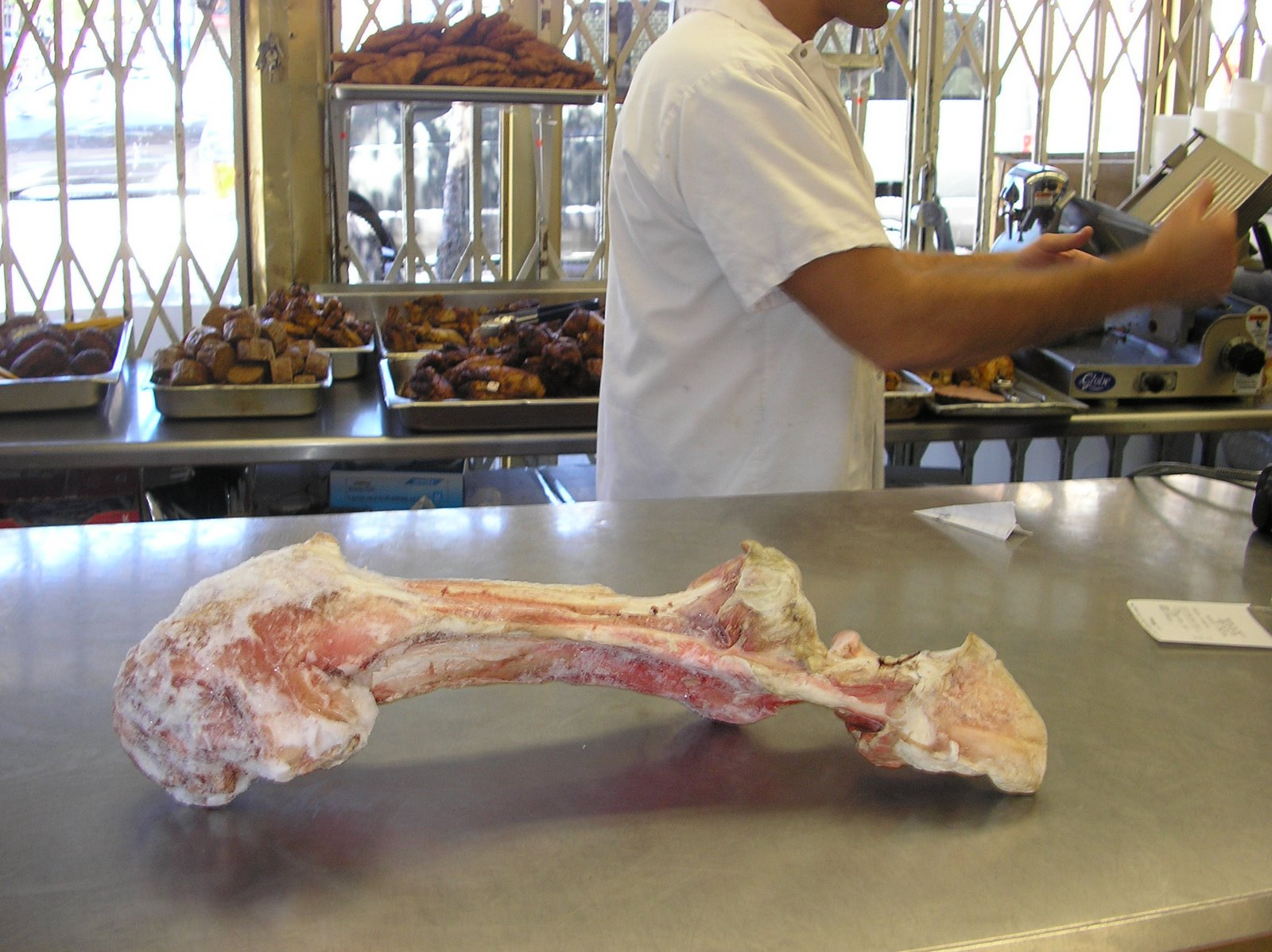
Foreleg of kosher-slaughtered animal

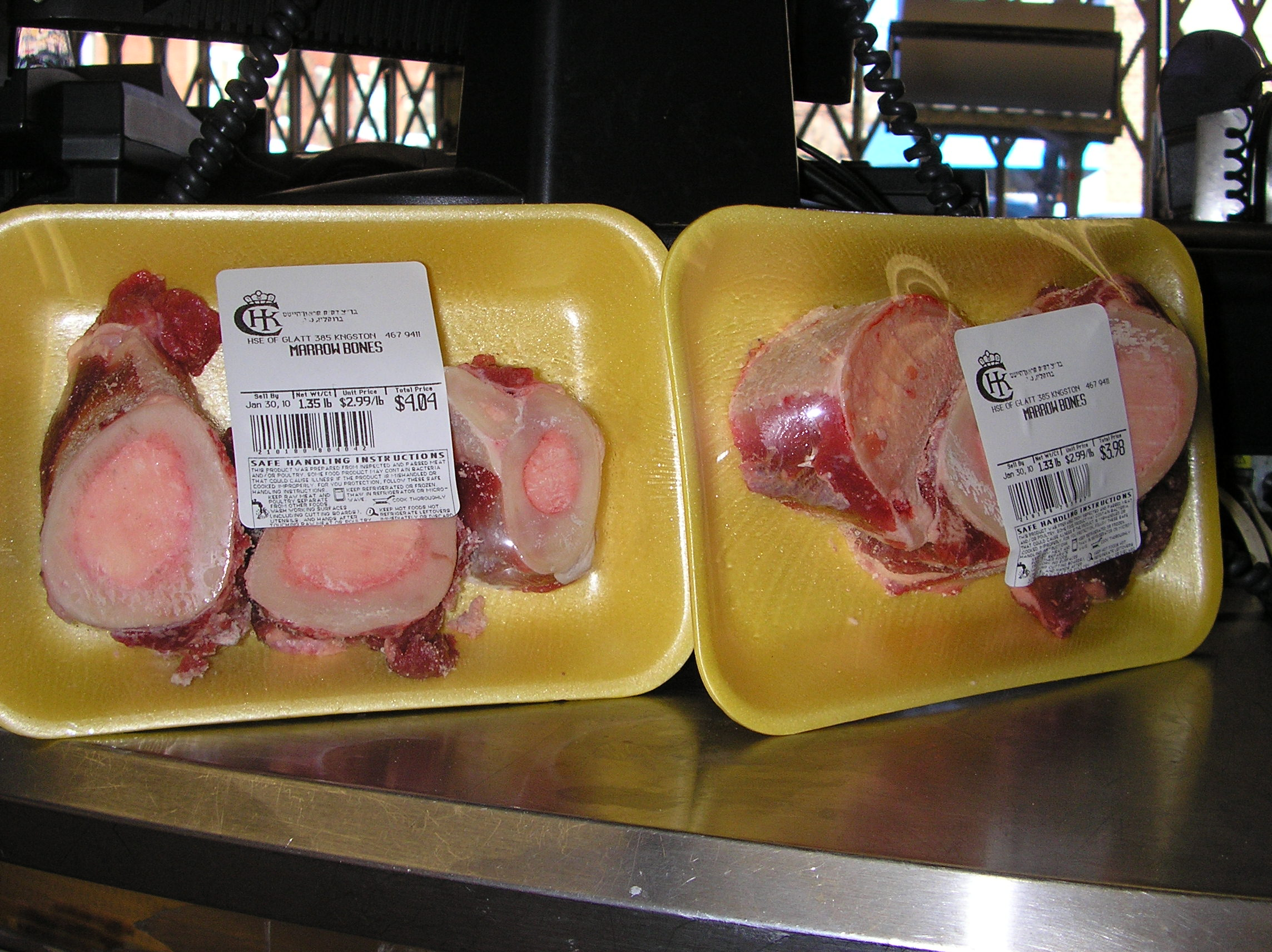
Foreleg part sold in form of "marrow bones"

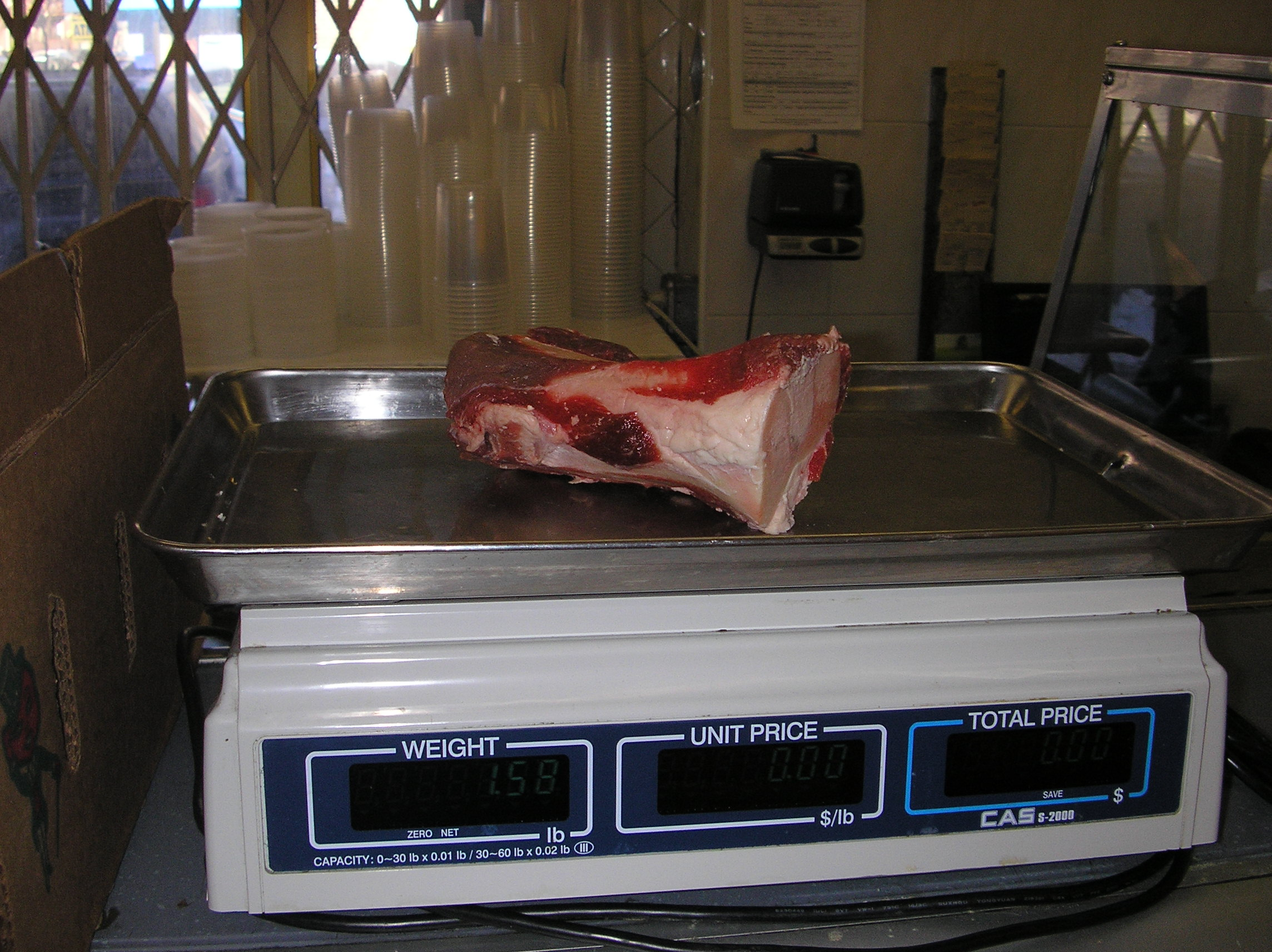
Foreleg part with weight shown

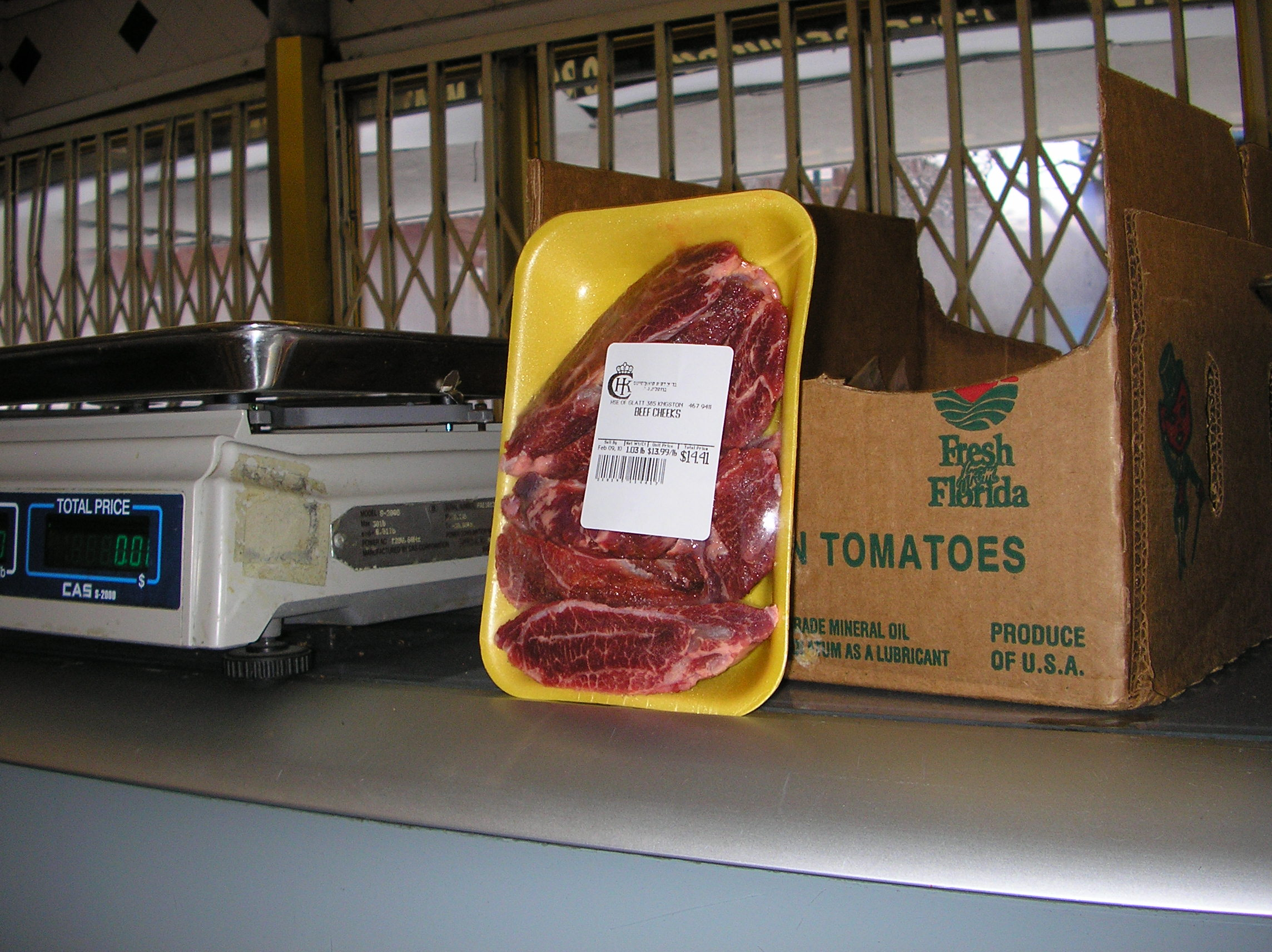
Kosher-slaughtered beef cheeks with price tag attached

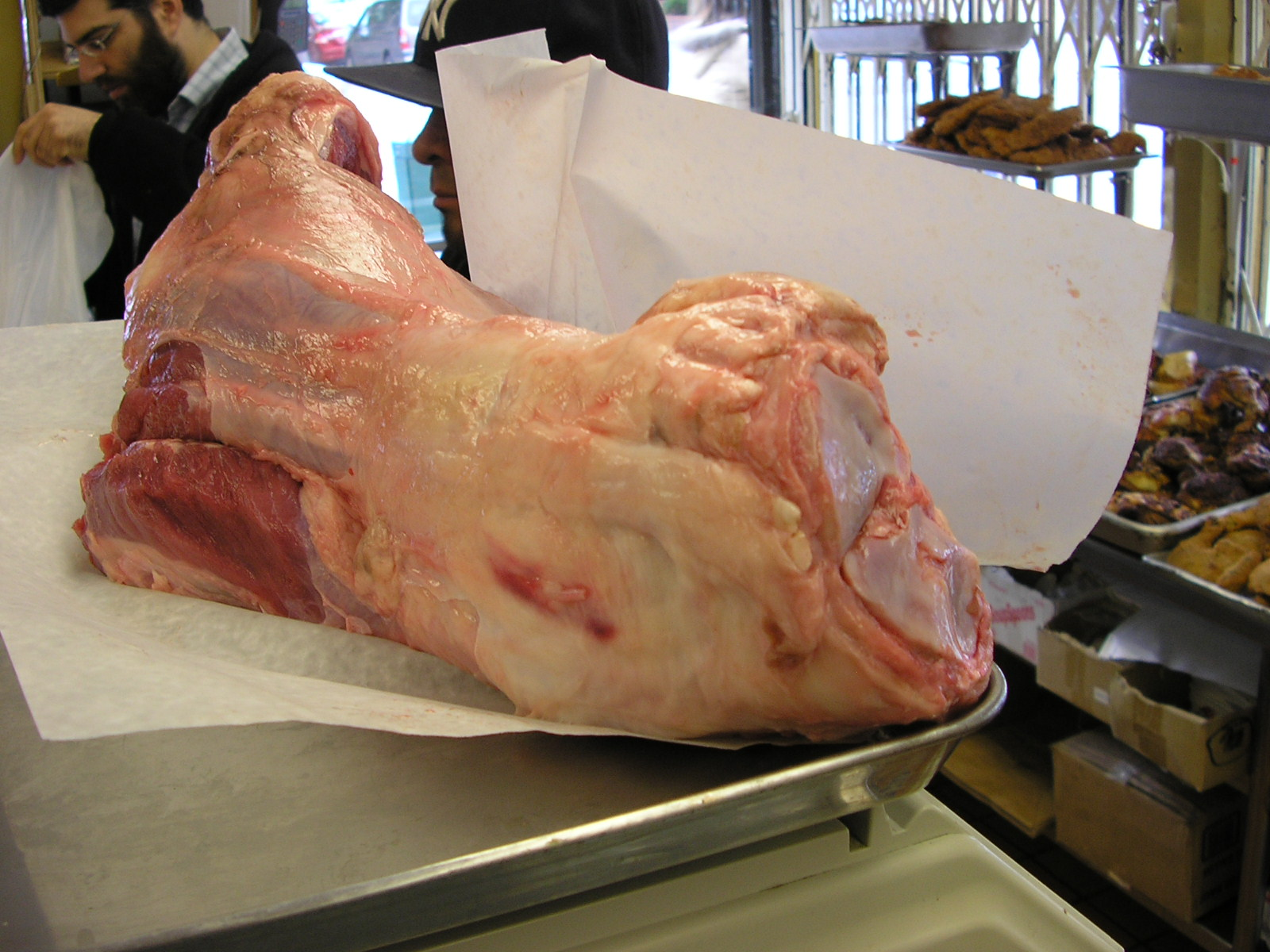
Foreleg from top-view downward

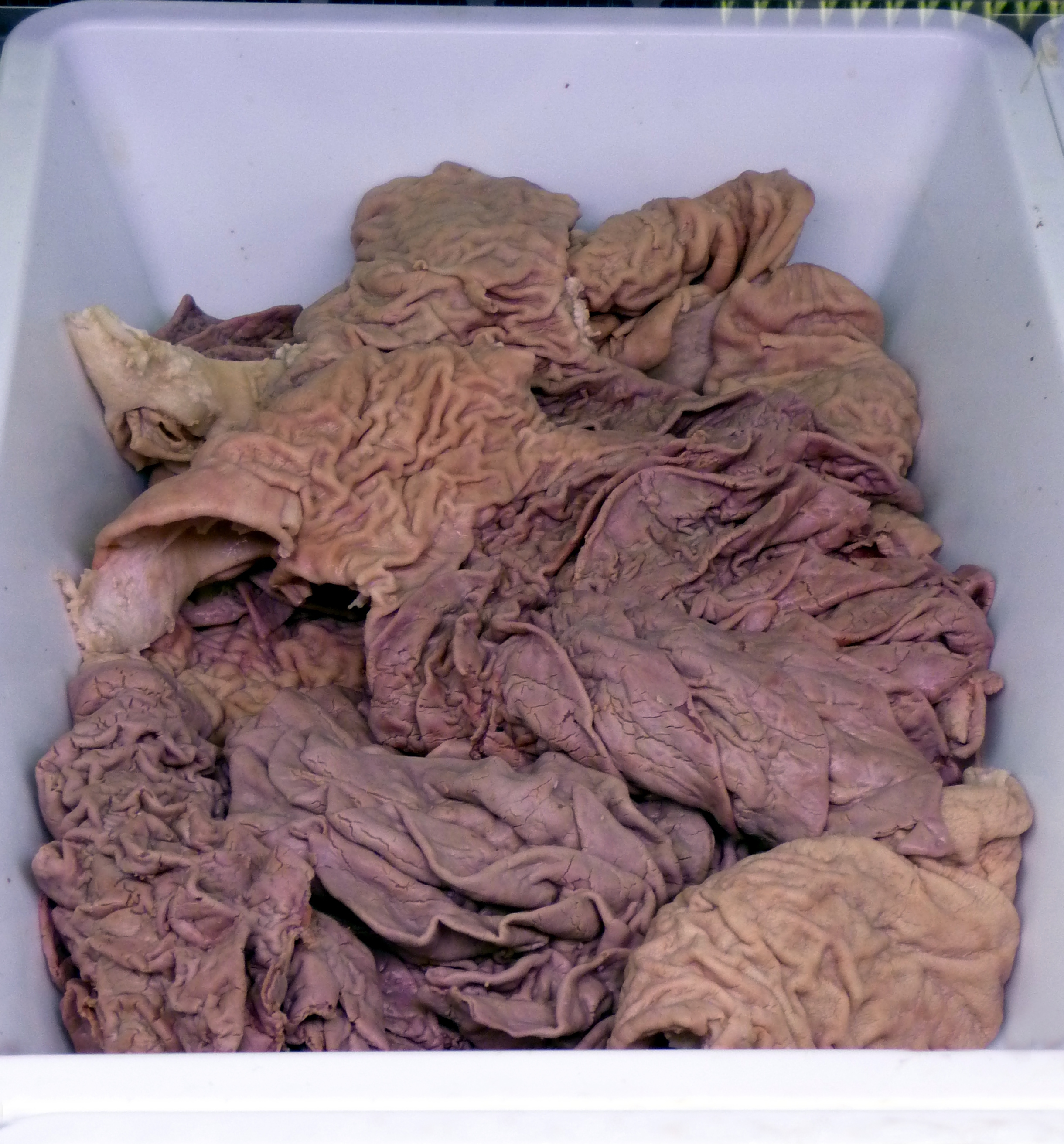
Abomasum

The gift of the foreleg, cheeks and maw (Hebrew: זְרועַ לְחָיַיִם וְקֵיבָה) of a kosher-slaughtered animal to a kohen is a positive commandment in the Hebrew Bible. The Shulchan Aruch rules that after the slaughter of animal by a shochet (kosher slaughterer), the shochet is required to separate the cuts of the foreleg, cheek and maw and give them to a kohen freely, without the kohen paying or performing any service.

== Hebrew Bible ==
The source of the gift to the priest (Hebrew: kohen) is found in Deuteronomy:

And this shall be the priests' due from the people, from them that offer a sacrifice, whether it be ox or sheep, that they shall give unto the priest the shoulder, and the two cheeks, and the maw.

== Rabbinic interpretation ==
In rabbinical interpretation this is a positive commandment requiring the shochet (ritual slaughterer) to give the aforementioned parts of a kosher-slaughtered animal to a kohen (excluding sacrificial animals such as Korban Olah or the Pascal lamb). This giving is required to be free of both monetary and servicial compensation.

These gifts are entirely mundane ("chullin"), and are not associated with all or part of the sacrificial offerings brought on the central altar in the Jerusalem temple.

The early Rabbinical authorities felt the need to specify the specific animal parts to be given due to confusion in understanding which animal parts the Torah verse refers to (for example which foreleg), and who is required to give them. The earliest extant Midrash on the above quoted text is found in the Sifri to Deuteronomy 18:3 which relays the following detail:

- Foreleg: The right foreleg in its entirety (with the skin attached)
- Cheeks: The lower jaw with attached cheek flesh, tongue included
- Maw: The abomasum in its entirety

== Applicability outside the Land of Israel ==
=== Mishnaic and Talmudic view ===
The Mishnah, Talmud, and Sifre state that the mitzvah applies both in the Land of Israel and in the diaspora. This is because the commandment is an obligation of the body, not of the land. The Talmud cites cases of penalties being levied against both individual transgressors and entire communities for failure to give these gifts.

=== Strict views among the Geonim, Rishonim, and Achronim ===
The view of Hai Gaon coincides with the Talmud regarding penalty, urging excommunication on those who do not carry out the commandment.

The majority of rishonim ruled the giving of the gifts to be mandatory, though a minority dissented.

According to Maimonides, the giving of the gifts is completely mandatory outside Israel, and one who did not give them is liable for excommunication.

Nachmanides opined that any leniency applied to giving of the gifts outside the land would lead to forgetting entirely about the practice. He therefore stated that regardless of whether outside Israel the obligation comes from the Torah or from rabbinic law, the gifts must be given outside the land.

The Raavad: "The practice of being lenient does not go well (in my opinion)..one should not act on this unrully (lit. evil) custom of not giving the gifts. Behold, when dealing with gift giving Rabbis are authorized to levy penalties".

The Mordechai wrote was that the gifts are to be given in the Diaspora, he argued against the logic of comparing ("Hekesh") the Gifts to the first-shearing of the Sheep ("Reishis Hagez").

The Vilna Gaon's shorthand comments on this topic are notably difficult to decipher. According to the commentary of Rabbi Shloma Leventhal of Jerusalem (published 2006), the Vilna Gaon sided with Rabbi Meir of Rothenburg and differentiating between the gifts and Reshit HaGez, making the gifts halachically mandatory. It is also recorded by the Gra's pupils that he actively engaged in giving the gifts.

=== Rashi's responsum ===
Rashi, in a responsum to Rabbi Yehuda the son of Rabbi Machir, attempted to justify the practice of the common folk withholding of the gift. Rashi cited the opinion of Rabbi Ilai I, who (as understood by the Talmud) believed that the commandment of reishit hagez does not apply outside Israel. Rashi then went a step further, saying that the priestly gifts (including foreleg, cheeks, maw) do not apply outside Israel, as the same logic applies to them as to reishit hagez. While the Talmud only mentions that Rabbi Ilai's ruling was accepted in practice (נהוג עלמא) in regard to reishit hagez, Rashi notes that not only does Rabbi Ilai's logic allow the same leniency for priestly gifts, but the leniency was observed to be commonly practiced (חזינא מה דנהוג) in Rashi's surroundings regarding priestly gifts as well. Rashi notes that this leniency should not be taught even to individuals, but where it is practiced, a rabbi does not need to object to it. Rashi then states that in many communities where Jews dwell there is a complete lack of Kohanim, making the giving of the gifts technically impossible. Rashi concludes with praise of those who are scrupulous in making the effort and give the gifts nonetheless.

However, it has recently been established that the opinion cited in the Rashi commentary to Talmud Bavli (tractate Shabbos p. 10b) has been a later addition entered by persons other than Rashi himself. It has been suggested that Rashi's pupils keyed in the text based on the above noted responsum. Some scholars denounce the insertion as leaving out Rashi's advocacy for giving the gifts as recorded in his responsum.

==== Meir of Rothenberg's response to Rashi ====
Dealing with the issue of gift giving outside the land of Israel Meir of Rothenburg was by far the most lengthy and detailed of all opining rabbis. By analyzing the issue at supreme depth, and implicitly differing from Rashi's opinion, Meir reasoned that reliance on Rabbi Elai in the Mishnah for leniency or/and invoking a hekesh between reishith haGez and the gifts is invalid.

Every one should separate the gifts and be wary of Rabbi Chisda's curse who said "the Kohen who refuses to separate the gifts should be excommunicated from the almighty, the G-d of Israel" and even more so an Israelite (a non-Kohen who refuses to give the gifts). And all of the congregation of Israel shall do it (the gift giving)

=== In Yemenite Jewry ===
Based on the responsa of the leading Yemenite Rabbi, Rabbi Yachya Tzalach it is apparent that the common practice of giving the gifts was adhered to by common Yemenite Jewry, up and well into the nineteenth century:

Know that the ancient custom was embedded here to separate the Gifts as per the opinion of the Rambam Master of our region, and not good was done by he who minimized this Mitzvah from the congregation of Hashem, since this custom has been with us from eternity.

== Mitzvah detail and exemptions ==
As per the commandment, a slaughtering by an individual or a group both require the giving of the gifts.

Based on Talmudic sources, the giving of the gifts by any functioning kosher meat slaughter operation is required in all instances; including partnership (Jew and non-Jew owned) or if owned by a Kohen.

=== The "marking" requirement ===
The Mishna stipulates that in the event the animal is owned by a non-Jew at Shechita time, the buyer (if Jewish) is required to "mark", without detailing what type of mark or for what purpose this mark is to serve.

Maimonides, in explaining the Mishna, writes that the actual gifts are to be marked to differentiate them from the other sections of meat so that they be given to the Kohen (in line with the Maimonides' ruling in Mishneh Torah that a non-Kohen is Halachically forbidden from consuming the actual gifts). Rashi, by contrast, explains the marking requirement as an eye-catching technique visible to all viewers of the meat advertising that the slaughtered animal was non-Jew owned at Shechita time. The intention, explains Rashi, is to preempt the viewer from assuming that the non-Kohen owner of the animal is violating the requirement of giving the gifts.

=== Rabbinic exemptions and loopholes ===
==== Pro-leniency loopholes ====
In the diaspora, due to the value of the actual gifts, leniency was sought in order to alleviate the high consumer end-cost of Kosher beef.

- The first recorded – and today still most popular – leniency produced involves a non-Jewish ownership or partnership of the animal at the time of slaughter as well as the Shochet commuting to the property of the non-Jew. Thus, at the slaughter time the animal is exempt. Next, the Jew decides on those portions he would like to purchase. This retroactive acquisition is termed Breira in Rabbinic terms. In this specific loophole the claim stated is ain Breira, i.e. the acquisition is not applied retroactively, hence rendering the animal non-Jew-owned at slaughter time.
- Claimants for leniency tout the Tur's concluding statement: "Rashi ruled that actual giving is not done in today's age and so wrote the Maharam of Rothenburg and this is what is acted on".
- Claimants also point out the closing statement of the Shulchan Aruch which concludes that in action giving is not done outside the land.
- The lineage of a Kohen being called into question, since the issue is monetary: the rule of "on he who seeks to withdraw lies the burden of proof".

==== Counter-leniency arguments ====
With leniency being common practice from time to time, the basis of inaction of the Mitzvah are called into question with the following counterclaims:

- The Mishna, when discussing partnering with a non-Jew, uses the single person form ("המשתתף" as opposed to "המשתתפים"), thereby alluding that the practice is not all that common. Also alluding that mass partnering with a non-Jew with the intent of skirting the mitzvah is entirely not up for Mishnaic debate in terms of the clarity of liability. The Prisha (commentarian to Tur Shulchan Aruch) argues that partnering with a non-Jew with the intent to excuse the obligation of giving the gifts is "ערמה" ("trickery") which causes the Kohen to lose out on his rightful due. This claim is lent additional validity by the Ra"n's ruling that if one acquires the gifts from a non-Jew, the acquirer is obligated to give the gifts to the Kohen.
- Counter-claimants further argue that the "Ain Breirah" explanation is inapplicable since in this instance one of two scenarios will play out for certain: either the animal will be deemed as glatt kosher or not. Being that most animals (70–90%) are indeed found to be glatt kosher, the acquisition of the animal is likely (more than 50%). Thus, to state Breirah is more fitting for this scenario. Henceforth, the animal becomes retroactively Jew-owned at the time of slaughter.
- In the instance where the cattle is Jew-owned and a non-Jew commits to purchase those animals found not to be glatt kosher, an exemption would be invalid, a detail easily and often overlooked with a permanent mindset of gift exemption in place.
- A partnership with a non-Jew may require instances where the partner, in case the animal is found not to be kosher, demands the slaughterer make certain statements just prior to the Shechita so the animal could be sold to adherents of other religions, causing the question of a hefsek in between the blessing the slaughterer is to make and the Shechita being performed, thereby making both non-Jew partnering and ownership undesirable.
- Proponents of giving the gifts point out that the Tur quoted only Rashi's Talmudic opinion while leaving Rashi's response out. Whereas Rashi directs Rabbinical figures not to instruct or reveal leniency to query posers, on the contrary Rashi heaped praise on practicing givers, while pointing out that lack of locating Kohanim to whom to give and the non-sanctic nature of the gifts are amongst the causes for inaction in the Diaspora.
- As for Rabbi Meir of Rothenburg's stance, proponents ascertain that the Tur was mistaken as to the Maharam's opinion, as the writing of three of the Rabbi Meir's prized pupils (i.e. the Mordechai, Rabbeinu Asher and the Tashbetz) document their mentor's opinion as being staunchly in favor of Diasporic gift giving. Additionally, based on the Maharam's response on its own right it is clear that the author's opinion was contrary to that stated by the Tur and entirely in accordance with his pupil's documentation.
- Counter-claimants further argue that one of Rabbi Yosef Karo's (author of Shulchan Aruch) cardinal rules is that, contrary to the common "bottom-line" reasoning, the ruling which is stated first is the primary opinion, whereas that which follows is not the Halachic first choice. Additionally Rabbi Karo was known to have adapted the majority of the "big three" (the Rambam Rif and Rosh), whereas in this instance the former two are advocates of Diasporic giving while the latter is undecided.
- A specific Kohen's lineage is immaterial since the Mitzvah is on the giver (and not for the Kohen to withdraw); thus, the burden of locating a "lineage-verifiable" Kohen rests on the giver. Notwithstanding that, modern Kohanim carry a forceful claim to Kehuna titled "Chazakah" which is deemed sufficient qualification for receipt of the foreleg, cheeks, and maw.

== Kosher status ==
In terms of "Kosher" (in this instance adopting the literal meaning as "in line" with the general and particular laws of the Torah) the Talmud and Rabbinic sages discuss various viewpoints as to whether the meat from an animal whose gifts have not been given may be eaten in part or if at all. The popular Rabbinic concern is that of "Gezel" (theft).

One underlying concern laid down by Rabbinic sources is a differentiation between the meat of the actual gifts and the meat from the rest of the animal.

=== The actual cheek meat, tongue, and foreleg ("marrow bones") ===
Concerning the eating of the actual gifts, Rabbinic authorities adopted a stringent view by stating that they may not be eaten by anyone but a Kohen unless the Kohen permits otherwise.

Although a Kohen is authorized to permit the consumption of the gifts by a non-Kohen, Rabbinical responses indicate that the gifts must first be placed in the hands of a Kohen before he is allowed to permit them to be eaten by a non-Kohen.

=== Meat other than the actual gifts ===
Concerning the Kashrut of the remainder of the meat (if the gifts have not been given), there is a difference of opinion between leading rabbinic sources. The common halachic stance is that this meat may be consumed, but nonetheless it is proper not to partake in this meat unless the giving of the gifts has been done.

==== The Yechezkel saga ====
Proponents of not eating the meat of an animal from which the appropriate gifts were not given cite the Talmudic comparison of such meat to "Piggul" based on the following Talmudic narrative: Yechezkel, upon being commanded by the almighty to consume bread baked by using human excrement as coal pleaded for leniency by exclaming that he was always scrupulous in watching what he ate in terms of Kashruth and purity and that never had "Piggul" (i.e. repulsive) meat entered his mouth (and therefore should not be instructed to bake his bread in such a repulsive fashion). The Talmud, in examining the contextual meaning of "Piggul" quotes the view of Rabbi Nathan who maintains that Yechezkiel's claim was that he never consumed meat from an animal of which gifts were not given to a Kohen. The Almighty then accepted Yechezkiel's plea as legitimate and instead instructed him to fire up his oven using animal dung.

== Reward for performing the mitzvah ==
Of the various segulot of doing this mitzvah is noted meriting Ruach HaKodesh. Likewise, divine intervention in assisting the Jewish nation with physical strength over their enemies is listed as well.

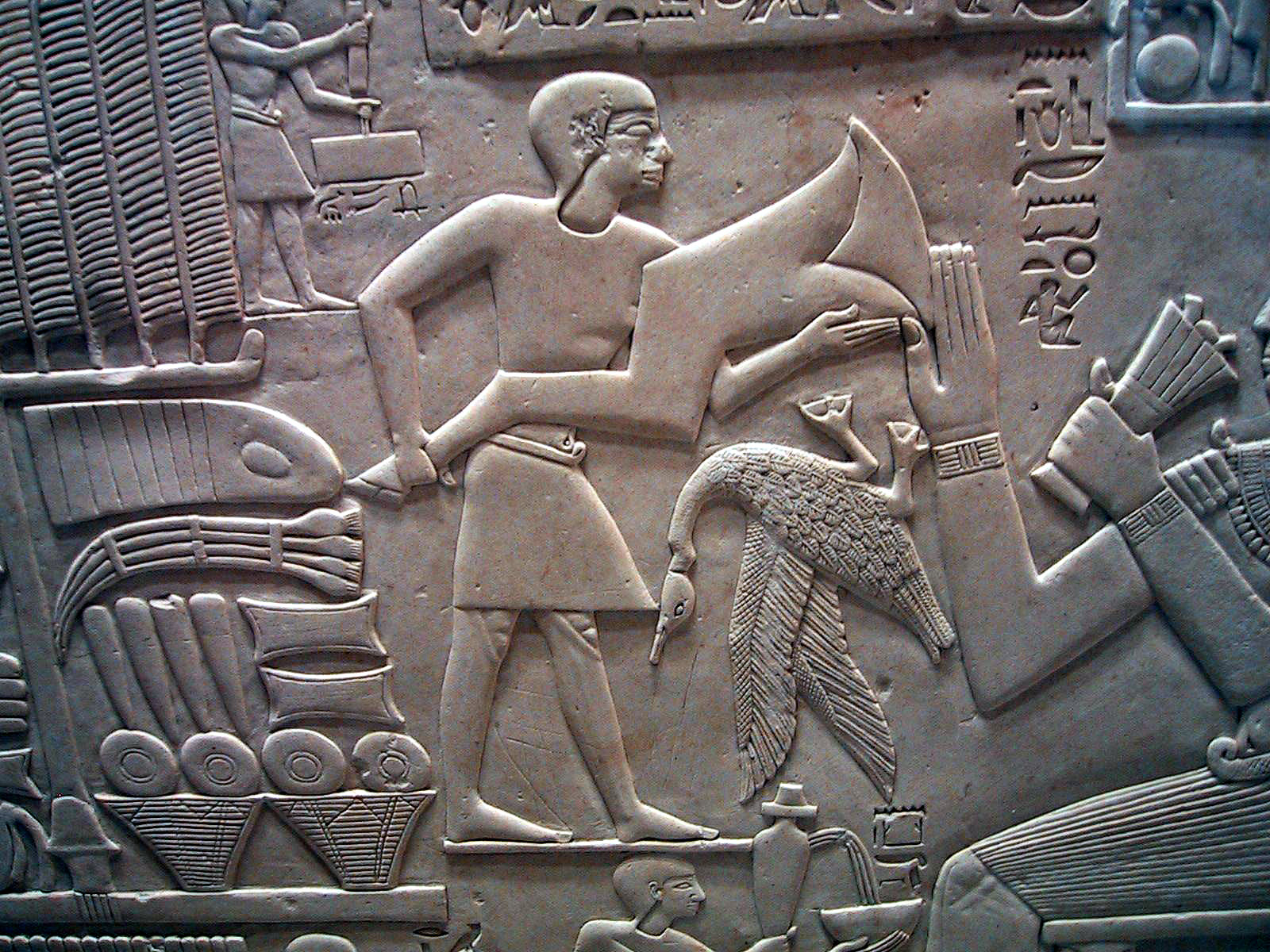
The foreleg of ox being presented as a choice gift in ancient Egypt

With the intent on relaying the divine consequence of neglecting the gift-giving in the Diaspora, the Talmud tells the following story:

"Rabbi, Rabbi! The Zoroastrians have come to power in Babylonia!" Rabbi Yochanan gasped and fell from his chair – just the thought of his fellow Jews in the Diaspora submitting to the strange decrees of the worshippers of Ahura Mazda left him in total shock. "Be at ease, dear leader," his students comforted him, "they can be bought off with money." Rabbi Yochanan, getting back onto his chair listened as his pupils briefed him on the particular decree the Zoroastrians put forth. "They refuse to let us Kosher-slaughter our animals." The Rabbi heard them out, and – in his famously curt manner – stated the spiritual cause of this seemingly ridiculous law: "It's because of the gifts."

— Tractate Yevamot 63b

== The Mitzvah in modern practice ==
=== In Israel ===
Per the investigation conducted by Rabbi Yaakov Epstien in 2005, many Jewish-owned slaughterhouses enter a binding agreement with a group of pre-screened Kohanim, with whom monetary compensation is offered in place of the original gifts (despite this being an agreement frowned upon by early Rabbinic authorities who insisted the actual gifts are to be given and not monetary compensation).

=== In the diaspora ===
By and large in the Diaspora today most Jews—even Ultra-Orthodox—are unaware of the Mitzvah entirely. Plausible explanation has been given by the famous Jerusalem Rabbi and Maimonides commentator Rabbi Yosef Corcous as follows:

- Rabbinically, a Kohen is to refrain from requesting the gifts since they are to be given by will. Hence without a call for claimage it is assumed that the Kohanim implicitly forgive the gifts.
- An Israelite married to a Kohen's daughter is exempt, as is a Levi, causing neighbors of the non-giver to assume that the gifts are not required to be given entirely.

The response often cited by today's Rabbis when confronted by queries into the modern day inaction of this Mitzvah is simply that the animal is owned by a non-Jew at the time of slaughter; whereas advocates of the gifts cite this ownership status as irrelevant since the intent is for the kosher-consumer. A modern effort of reviving the gifts in a practical manner has been somewhat successful in recent years with senior members of the Orthodox Union indicating positive action will be implemented.

=== The pious viewpoint ===
From a somewhat pious perspective and disregarding the common practice of reliance on questioned Rabbinic loopholes, it has been the practice of select Chassidim to take the stricter approach in giving the gifts and to refrain from eating the meat of an animal from which the gifts were not given.

This view is quoted by popular Rabbis as recent as Rabbi Yonason Eibeshitz and the Chasam Sofer.

=== Modern dollar value of the gifts ===
The approximate dollar value of the gifts carried by an adult cow is as follows:

- 0.5 pounds of cheek meat: $14.99 lb.
- 1.5 pounds of fresh tongue: $9.99 lb.
- 10 pounds of marrow bones (and beef-stew quality cuts) in the foreleg: $5.99 lb.
- Abomasum: N/A

The total value is approximately $82.47 per cow. Multiplied by the number of days in a calendar year, multiplied by the number of glatt kosher cattle slaughtered daily (750) equals $22,576,162.50 annually as the dollar value of the Mitzvah in the United States.
