= Priestly court =

In Judaism, the priestly court (beit din shel kohanim, Hebrew: בית דין של כהנים; also translated as the beit din of the priests or Court of the Priests) was a court of Jewish law, composed of priests descended from Aaron, which operated at the Temple in Jerusalem and oversaw matters related to the priesthood and Temple rituals.

The priestly court coexisted with the Sanhedrin, which was generally the legal authority for non-Temple matters. According to rabbinic literature, the priestly court consisted solely of priests of verified patrilineal descent from Aaron ("Kohanim meyuchashim"), while the Sanhedrin which was composed of members of all twelve tribes of Israel. Some scholars are of the opinion that the 23 members of the priestly court also served in the Sanhedrin, roughly a third of the latter's 71 members.

== Biblical sources ==
The priestly court is not mentioned in the Hebrew Bible. According to the Sifrei, it is hinted to in Numbers 18:7 ("Therefore thou and thy sons with thee shall keep your priest's office for every thing of the altar, and within the veil..."); the Sifrei explains that "There was a place behind the veil where they would check priestly lineage".

Several Biblical verses describe the priests specifically as teachers of the Torah. Priests were expected to function as judges (Deuteronomy 21:5); the absence of a priest who could teach was described as a national misfortune (2 Chronicles 15:3). The priest's authority to teach is not automatic, but depends on his having a thorough knowledge of Torah law as well as priestly ancestry.

In Zechariah 3:7 the High Priest is expected to "judge [God's] house and guard [God's] courtyards".

== Location ==
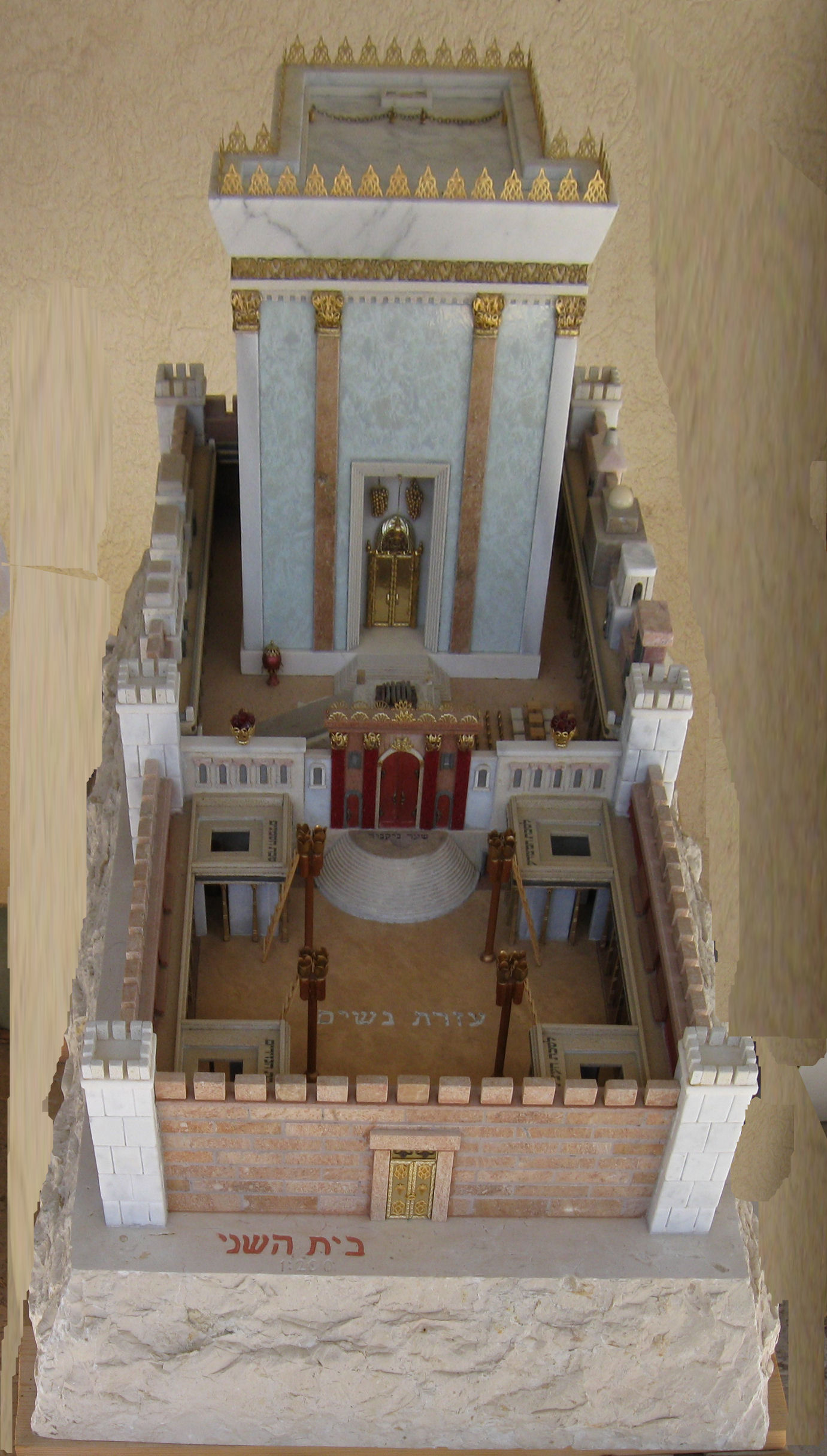
Model of Second Temple Behind the tall structure (the hekhal) is the place where the priestly court would function.

The court performed its duties within the Temple complex, in the eleven ammoth located between the western wall of the Holy of Holies and the western wall of the azarah (Temple courtyard). This area was also known in Hebrew as achurei beit hakaporeth ("behind the Holy of Holies"). This is in accordance with the aforementioned Sifrei, specifying that the court operated "behind the veil" of the Holy of Holies.

== Roles ==
The term Beit Din shel kohanim is mentioned by name only twice in Tannaitic and once in Amoraic literature, and this has caused confusion regarding its meaning. The three mentions are as follows:

- The Mishnah records that the ketubah amount levied by this court was twice as high as the normal amount: "The priestly court used to levy 400 zuz for a virgin, and the Sages did not reprove them."
- The Tosefta records that when a Jewish king would write a Torah scroll as commanded, the priestly court would store it (alternative text: edit it for correctness).
- The Babylonian Talmud records that this court remained in session as long as the Temple donations were not used up.

These three tasks appear to be unrelated, which has led scholars to suspect that if a single court were responsible for these tasks, it would likely also have been responsible for many other tasks where the exact term Beit Din shel kohanim is not used. Many passages which refer to the roles of "the sons of the high priests", "the elders of the priests", "the priests" (in a legal context), "the court" (in a Temple context), or "the Hasmonean court" have been suggested as referring to the court of priests, though these suggestions are not universally accepted. One suggestion is that there was not a single priestly court, but rather any court convened for a specific purpose and composed of priests was called "a priestly court".

=== Priestly lineage ===
As mentioned in the Sifrei, the priestly court verified the lineage of priests. Some scholars describe this task as shared with the Sanhedrin. Some argue that the Sanhedrin would perform a one-time investigation elevating the investigated Kohen from "status quo" status to kohen meyuchas status ("Kohen-lineage verified by beit-din"), while the priestly court would continuously monitor the currently serving Kohanim regarding their observance of the various priestly laws.

=== Temple service ===
The priestly court ran the daily Temple operations, and possibly controlled the initiation ceremonies of inaugurating new vessels ("Kli sharet") to be used in the temple. Rabbeinu Chananel was of the opinion that the priestly court also oversaw the appointing and rotation of the 24 priestly divisions.

The Mishnah implies that this court played an active role in declaring new months:

Tuvia the physician .. saw the new (moon).. and his son and his freed servant, and the Kohanim admitted (the testimony) of him and his son and disqualified his servant. And when they came before the beth din (hagadol) they admitted him and his servant and disqualified his son(s testimony).

Rabbi Menachem Schneerson explains the involvement of the Beth din shel Kohanim in declaring Rosh Chodesh as due to the special sacrifice that was offered on Rosh Chodesh, over which the priestly court would preside.

Apparently, this court played an active role in the Yom Kippur temple service; which included the appointing of a priest to escort the scapegoat sacrifice to the desert. According to Rashi, they ruled that the scapegoat be led to the cliff by kohanim, even though it may Biblically be done by any Jew. Mishnah commentators point out that it is also likely that the priestly court was dutifully meticulous that the Kohen Gadol would carry out his duties as required.

=== Other functions ===
The Mishnah states that the priestly court was authorized to levy the death penalty ("dinei nefashot").
