= List of Talmudic principles =

The Talmud uses many types of logical arguments. Some of the most common arguments and terms are listed here.

== Chazakah (presumption) ==
The term chazakah (Hebrew: חזקה — literally, "strong") usually refers to the default assumption; i.e., what is assumed until there is evidence to the contrary. For example, if one is known to have owned real estate, it is assumed that he still owns it until proven otherwise. However, with movable items, the chazakah lies with whoever currently has the item in his possession, not with the one who had previously owned it.

This principle also applies in ritual law. For example: Food known to be kosher maintains its status until there is evidence to the contrary. Also, one who engages in acts done only by kohanim is assumed to be a kohen himself, until proven otherwise (see Presumption of priestly descent).

== De'oraita and derabanan ==
A law is de'oraita (Aramaic: דאורייתא, "of the Torah," i.e. scriptural) if it was given with the written Torah. A law is derabbanan (Aramaic: דרבנן, "of our rabbis," Rabbinic) if it is ordained by the rabbinical sages. The concepts of de'oraita and derabbanan are used extensively in Jewish law.

Sometimes it is unclear whether an act is de'oraita or derabbanan. For example: the Talmud says the prohibition of reciting an unnecessary berakhah (blessing formulated with God's name) violates the verse Thou shalt not take the name of the Lord thy God in vain. Maimonides sees the Talmud as proving a de'oraita prohibition, while Tosafot considers the law to be only derabbanan, and sees the Talmud's scriptural reference as only an asmachta (support).

An article by R' Osher Weiss makes further distinctions between various types of de'oraita or derabbanan commandments, describing a hierarchy of no less than 18 levels of significance for mitzvot.

=== Examples ===
Examples of the application of these two terms abound. Examples include:

- Birkat Hamazon contains four blessings. While the first three are considered de'oraita, the fourth blessing was added much later on in Jewish history and is derabbanan.
- Regarding the verse "Thou shall not boil a kid in its mother's milk": From this, many laws of kashrut are derived by the rabbis. One might think this would make it derabbanan because it was derived by the rabbis, but the laws are actually de-'oraita because they are derived by interpreting the Torah. However, the extension of this prohibition to eating chicken with milk is derabbanan, as it is the product of a specific rabbinic enactment.

=== Modern observance ===
The application of differences between rabbinic and biblical mitzvot can sometimes make practical differences.

Safek (doubt)
In a case where it is uncertain whether a commandment applies: If the commandment is de'oraita one must follow the stricter of the two possibilities; if the commandment is derabbanan one may take the lenient position.
Bediavad (extenuating circumstances)
In cases of extenuating circumstances regarding a derabbanan, decisors of Jewish law sometimes apply the law leniently.

== Kal vachomer (a fortiori) ==
A kal vachomer (Hebrew: קל וחומר, literally "lenient and strict") derives one law from another through the following logic: If a case that is generally strict has a particular leniency, a case that is generally lenient will certainly have that leniency. The argument can also work in reverse, and also in areas where lenient or strict might not be precisely applicable.

== Migo ==
A migo (Aramaic: מיגו, literally "out of" or "since") is an argument for a defendant that he ought to be believed regarding a certain claim, because he could have made a different claim which would definitely have been believed.

For example, if one party claims (without evidence) that another borrowed money, the latter person could claim that he never borrowed anything, so he is believed if he states that he borrowed and repaid it.

== See also ==
- Mitzvah § Rabbinical mitzvot
- Takkanah
- Talmudical hermeneutics
