= Kohen =

Hereditary priest in Judaism

Kohen (Hebrew: כֹּהֵן, romanized: kōhēn, pronounced [koˈ(h)en]; pl. כֹּהֲנִים, kōhănīm, [ko(h)aˈnim]) is the Hebrew word for "priest", used in reference to the Aaronic priesthood, also called Aaronites or Aaronides. They are traditionally believed, and halakhically required, to be of direct patrilineal descent from the biblical Aaron (also Aharon), brother of Moses, and thus belong to the Tribe of Levi.

During the existence of the Temple in Jerusalem (and previously the Tabernacle), kohanim performed the Temple sacrificial offerings, which were only permitted to be offered by them. Following its destruction, it seems that most of them joined Synagogal Judaism before adopting gradually Rabbinic Judaism, other types of Judaism. Today, kohanim retain a lesser though distinct status within Rabbinic and Karaite Judaism, including certain honors and restrictions.

In the Samaritan community, the kohanim have remained the primary religious leaders.

== Name ==
The word kohen originally derives from a Semitic root common at least to the Central Semitic languages. In the ancient polytheistic religion of Phoenicia, the word for priest was khn (𐤊𐤄𐤍). The cognate Arabic word كاهن (kāhin) means "priest".

The noun kohen is used in the Bible to refer to priests, whether Jewish or pagan (such as the kohanim of Baal or Dagon), although Christian priests are referred to in modern Hebrew by the term komer (כומר). Kohanim can also refer to the Jewish nation as a whole, as in Exodus 19:6, where the whole of Israel is addressed as a "priestly kingdom (or: kingdom of priests) and a holy nation".

In Targum Yonatan, interpretive translations of the word kohen include "friend", "master", and "servant". Other interpretations include "minister" (Mechilta to Parshah Jethro, Exodus 18:1–20:23).

== Individuals and history ==
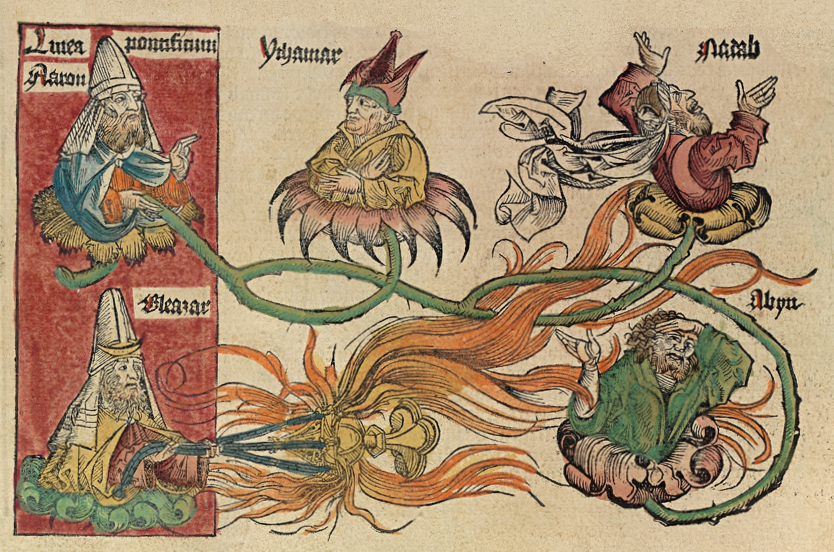
Illustration of Aaron's lineage from the 1493 Nuremberg Chronicle

The early books of the Bible mention several pagan priests, such as Potipherah, the other priests of Egypt, and Jethro.

The non-Jewish priest Melchitzedek, however, is described as worshipping the same God as Abraham. Later Jewish sources even discuss the possibility that Melchitzedek's family could have served as priests for the future Jewish nation, though in the end this did not happen.

Jewish priests are first mentioned in Exodus 19. Here God offered the entire Jewish people the opportunity to become a symbolic "kingdom of priests and a holy nation". More practically, though, in this chapter "the priests who approach the Lord" were warned to stay away from Mount Sinai during the revelation of the Ten Commandments. The identity of these priests is not specified. According to many later Jewish sources, the firstborn son in each family served as priests, starting in the period of the patriarchs.

Nevertheless, shortly after the Sinai revelation, Aaron and his sons were chosen to be the priests. The exclusive possession of the priesthood by Aaron's descendants was known as the priestly covenant. Many commentators assert that the firstborns lost their status due to their participation in the golden calf sin. A number of reasons have been suggested for why Aaron and his descendants were chosen instead:

- Due to Aaron's role in the Exodus, alongside Moses
- As reward for greeting Moses cheerfully (Exodus 4:14), willingly subordinating himself to Moses in the Exodus, even though he (Aaron) was the elder of the two brothers
- Because Aaron possessed a higher level of prophecy than anyone at the time except Moses himself
- The Tribe of Levi, and possibly even Aaron's own family within that tribe, maybe have been chosen for Divine service even before the Exodus.
- Because Moses himself was unsuitable to serve as priest, either for general reasons (e.g., the priestly duties would not have left Moses enough time for leadership and Torah instruction) or as punishment for trying to avoid his Divine mission in Exodus 4:13
- Because Moses had a non-Israelite wife (Tzipporah), while Aaron's wife Elisheba was not only Israelite but noble (the sister of Nahshon prince of Judah), and thus more suitable to found the priestly family

Moses, too, performed sacrificial services before the completion of Aaron's consecration, and arguably is once called a "priest" in the Bible, but his descendants were not priests.

Since Aaron was a descendant of the Tribe of Levi, priests are sometimes included in the term Levites, by direct patrilineal descent. However, not all Levites are priests.

During the 40 years of wandering in the wilderness and until the Holy Temple was built in Jerusalem, the priests performed their priestly service in the portable Tabernacle.

== Ancient roles ==
=== Laws and duties ===
Priestly duties involved offering the Temple sacrifices, and delivering the Priestly Blessing. When the Temple existed, most sacrifices and offerings could only be conducted by priests. Non-priest Levites (i.e. those who descended from Levi but not from Aaron) performed a variety of other Temple roles, including ritual slaughter of sacrificial animals, song service by use of voice and musical instruments, and various tasks in assisting the priests in performing their service.

The kohanim were not granted any ancestral land to own. Instead, they were compensated for their service to the nation and in the Temple through the twenty-four kohanic gifts. Most of these gifts are related to Temple sacrifices, or else the agricultural produce of the Land of Israel (such as terumah). A notable gift which is given even in the Jewish diaspora is the five shekels of the pidyon haben ceremony.

=== Vestments ===
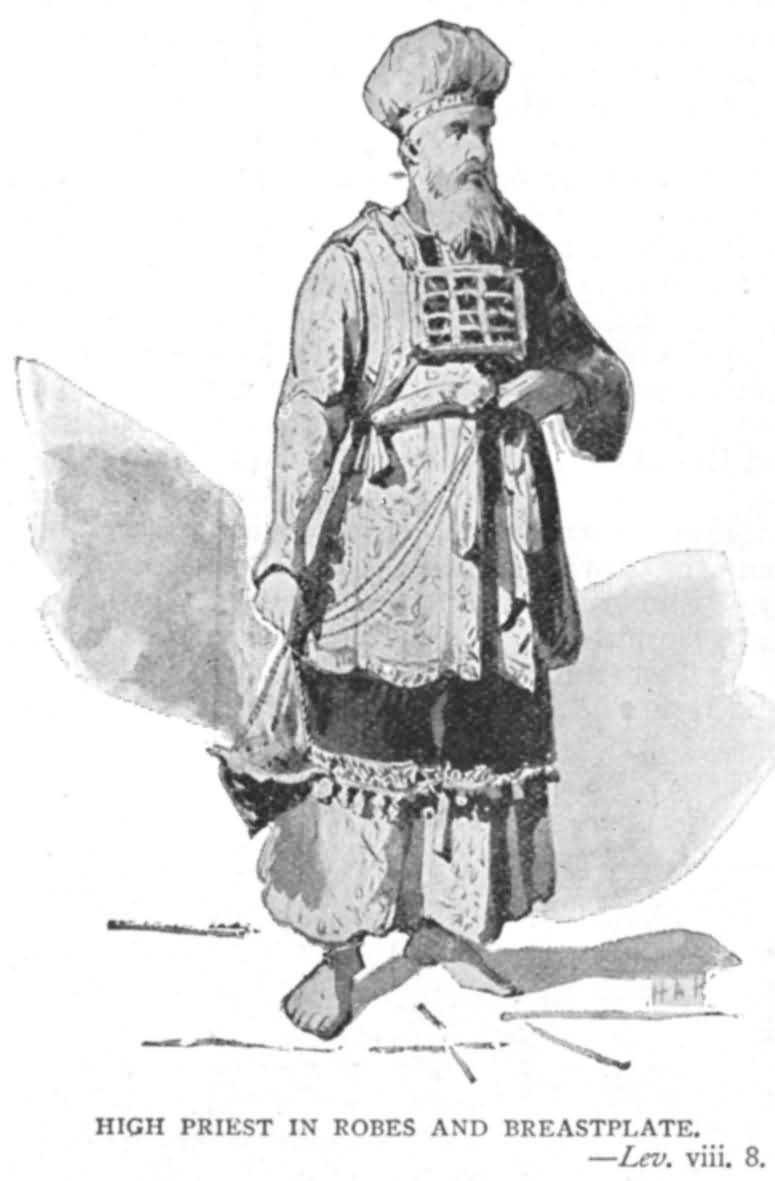
The high priest in his golden garments (the chain censer depicted is anachronistic).

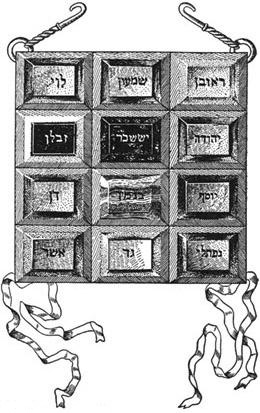
The priestly breastplate of the high priest.

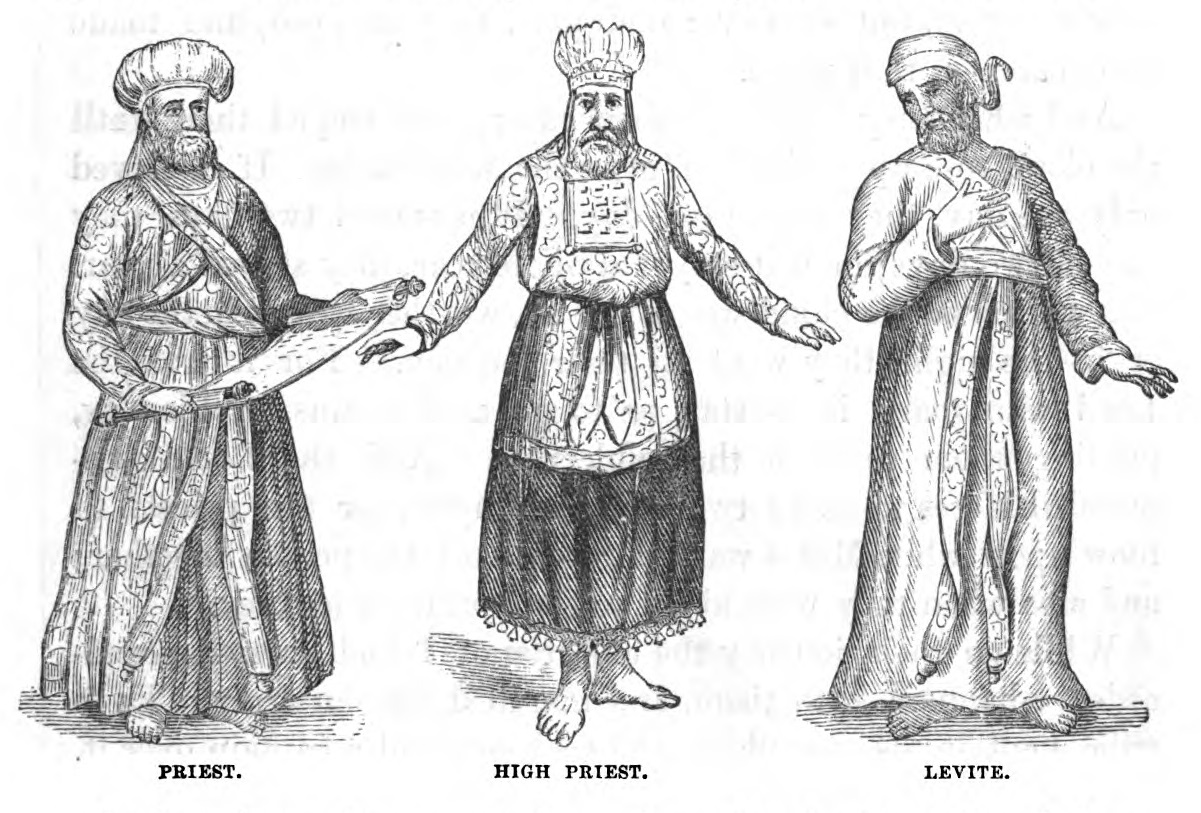
Kohen, Kohen Gadol and a Levite (Charles Foster, 1873)

The Torah provides for specific vestments to be worn by the priests when they are ministering in the Tabernacle: "And you shall make holy garments for Aaron your brother, for dignity and for beauty". These garments are described in Exodus 28, Exodus 39 and Leviticus 8. The high priest wore eight holy garments (bigdei kodesh). Of these, four were of the same type worn by all priests and four were unique to the high priest.

Those vestments which were common to all priests were:

- Priestly undergarments (Hebrew מִכְנָסַיִם michnasayim, breeches): linen pants reaching from the waist to the knees "to cover their nakedness" (Exodus 28:42)
- Priestly tunic (Hebrew כְּתֹנֶת ketonet, tunic): made of pure linen, covering the entire body from the neck to the feet, with sleeves reaching to the wrists. That of the high priest was embroidered, those of the priests were plain.
- Priestly sash (Hebrew אַבְנֵט avnet, sash): that of the high priest was of fine linen with "embroidered work" in blue and purple and scarlet (Exodus 28:39, 39:29); those worn by the priests were of white, twined linen.
- Priestly turban (Hebrew מִצְנֶפֶת mitznefet): that of the high priest was much larger than that of the priests and wound so that it formed a broad, flat-topped turban; that for priests was wound so that it formed a cone-shaped turban, called a migbahat.

The vestments that were unique to the high priest were:

- Priestly robe (Hebrew מְעִיל me'il): a sleeveless, blue robe, the lower hem of which was fringed with small golden bells alternating with pomegranate-shaped tassels in blue, purple, and scarlet—tekhelet, argaman, tolaat shani.
- Ephod (Hebrew אֵפוֹד): a richly embroidered vest or apron with two onyx engraved gemstones on the shoulders, on which were engraved the names of the tribes of Israel
- Priestly breastplate (Hebrew חֹשֶׁן hoshen): with twelve precious and semi-precious stones, each engraved with the name of one of the tribes; a pouch in which he probably carried the Urim and Thummim (objects of unclear nature used for divination). The hoshen was fastened to the Ephod.
- Priestly headplate (Hebrew צִיץ tzitz): worn on the front of the turban, and inscribed with the words: "Holy unto YHWH".

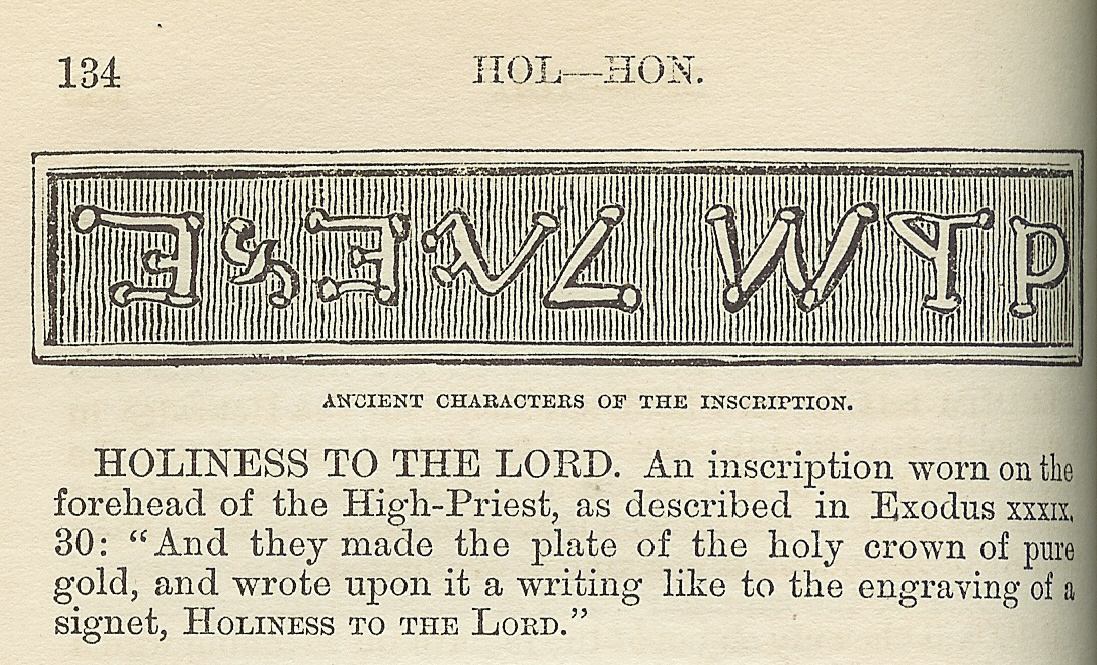
Qodeš l-Yahweh (Paleo-Hebrew alphabet), "Holy to Yahweh", an inscription worn on the forehead of the High Priest of Israel

In addition to the above "golden garments", the high priest also had a set of white "linen garments" (bigdei ha-bad) which he wore only for the Yom Kippur Temple service. The linen garments were only four in number, corresponding to the garments worn by all priests (undergarments, tunic, sash and turban), but made only of white linen, with no embroidery. They could be worn only once, new sets being made each year.

A priest would serve barefoot in the Temple, and would immerse in a mikvah before vesting, and wash his hands and his feet before performing any sacred act. The Talmud teaches that priests were only fit to perform their duties when wearing their priestly vestments, and that the vestments achieve atonement for sin, just as sacrifices do.

According to the Talmud, the wearing of the Priestly golden head plate atoned for the sin of arrogance on the part of the Children of Israel (B.Zevachim 88b) and she also symbolizes that the high priest bears the lack of all the offerings and gifts of the sons of Israel. And it must be constantly on his head for the good pleasure of God towards them (Exodus 28:38).

- According to the Talmud, the wearing of the Priestly turban atoned for the sin of haughtiness on the part of the Children of Israel (B. Zevachim 88b).
- According to the Talmud, the wearing of the Priestly ephod atoned for the sin of idolatry on the part of the Israelites.
- According to the Talmud, the wearing of the Hoshen atoned for the sin of errors in judgment on the part of the Children of Israel.
- According to the Talmud, the wearing of the Priestly sash atoned for "sins of the heart" (impure thoughts) on the part of the Children of Israel.
- According to the Talmud, the wearing of the Priestly tunic and the rest of the priestly garments atoned for the sin of bloodshed on the part of the Children of Israel (B.Zevachim 88b).
- According to the Talmud, the Priestly undergarments atone for the sin of sexual transgressions on the part of the Children of Israel (B.Zevachim 88b).

=== Torah instruction ===
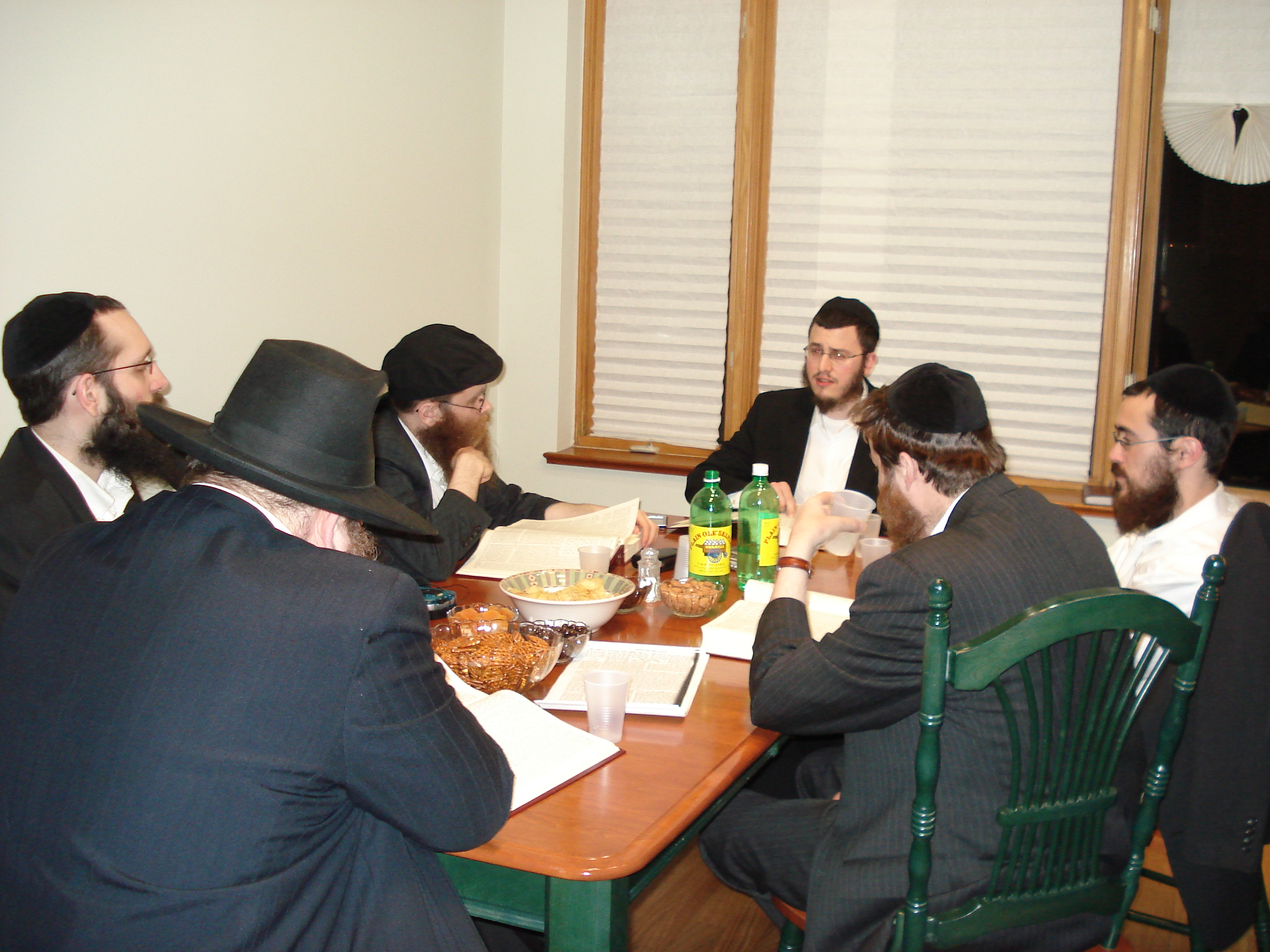
A group of kohanim studying the Mishnayot laws of Keilim in anticipation of the rebuilding of the Beit Hamikdash

Numerous Biblical passages attest to the role of the priests in teaching Torah to the people and in issuing judgment. Later rabbinic statements elaborate on these roles. However, the priest's religious authority is not automatic: even a bastard who is a scholar takes precedence over an ignorant high priest.

=== High Priest ===
In every generation when the Temple was standing, one kohen would be singled out to perform the functions of the High Priest (Hebrew kohen gadol). His primary task was the Day of Atonement service. Another unique task of the high priest was the offering of a daily meal sacrifice; he also held the prerogative to supersede any priest and offer any offering he chose. Although the Torah retains a procedure to select a High Priest when needed, in the absence of the Temple in Jerusalem, there is no High Priest in Judaism today.

=== Twenty-four kohanic divisions ===
According to 1 Chronicles 24:3–5, King David divided the priests into 24 priestly divisions (Heb. משמרות, mishmarot). Each division would perform the Temple service for one week in a 24-week cycle, with all divisions eligible to serve on holidays. According to the Talmud, this was an expansion of a previous division, by Moses, into 8 (or 16) divisions.

Following the destruction of the Second Temple, and the displacement to the Galilee of the bulk of the remaining Jewish population after the Bar Kokhba revolt, Jewish tradition in the Talmud and poems from the period record that the descendants of each priestly watch established a separate residential seat in towns and villages of the Galilee, and maintained this residential pattern for at least several centuries in anticipation of the reconstruction of the Temple and reinstitution of the cycle of priestly courses. In subsequent years, there was a custom of publicly recalling every Shabbat in the synagogues the courses of the priests, a practice that reinforced the prestige of the priests' lineage. Following this destruction, it seems that most of them joined the Synagogal Jewish movement; before being gradually converted towards Rabbinic Judaism and Christianity.

=== Qualifications and disqualifications ===
Although kohanim may assume their duties once they reached physical maturity, the fraternity of kohanim generally would not allow young kohanim to begin service until they reached the age of twenty or thirty. There was no mandatory retirement age. Only when a kohen became physically infirm could he no longer serve.

A kohen may become disqualified from performing his service for a host of reasons, including ritual impurity, prohibited marriages, and certain physical blemishes. The kohen is never permanently disqualified from service, but may return to his normal duties once the disqualification ceases.

== Modern practice ==
Since the destruction of the Second Temple in 70 CE, Jewish priests have not performed sacrificial services. However, they have retained a formal and public ceremonial role in synagogue prayer services, along with certain unique religious duties and privileges. Following the First Jewish–Roman War, the priestly class relocated to Galilee and various diaspora communities, with their new places of residence recorded in inscriptions from the period. Drawing on their knowledge of the Torah and Temple worship, they contributed to the development of synagogue liturgy and may have played a role in the preparation of biblical translations.

These special roles have been maintained in Orthodox Judaism, and sometimes in Conservative Judaism. Reform Judaism does not afford any special status or recognition to kohanim.

- In Jerusalem is "Temple Institute" whose mission is to prepare the Jewish People and the non jewish nations of the world for the Third Temple which will take the place of the first two destroyed Jewish Temples. Even the Anti-Zionist Toldos Aharon chassidic movement has established a specialized study program for Jewish priests (kohanim) to prepare for Temple service.

=== Synagogue aliyah ===
When the Torah reading is performed in synagogue, it is divided into a number of sections. Traditionally, a kohen (if one is present) is called for the first section (aliyah), a Levite for the second reading, and an "Israelite" (non-kohen, non-levite) for all succeeding portions. If no Levite is present, the kohen is called for the second aliyah as well. The Maftir portion may be given to someone from any of the three groups.

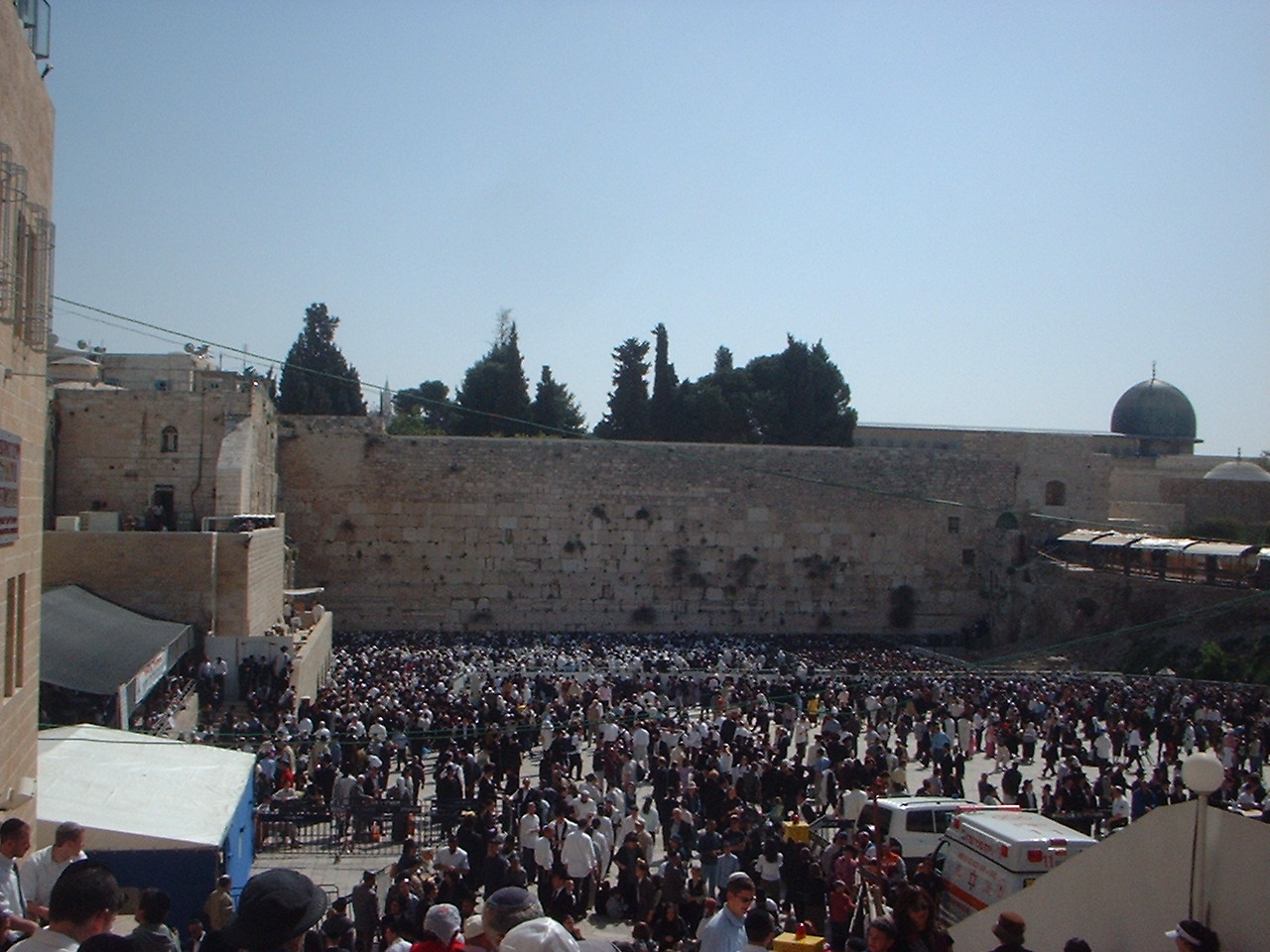
Large crowds congregate on Passover at the Western Wall to receive the priestly blessing

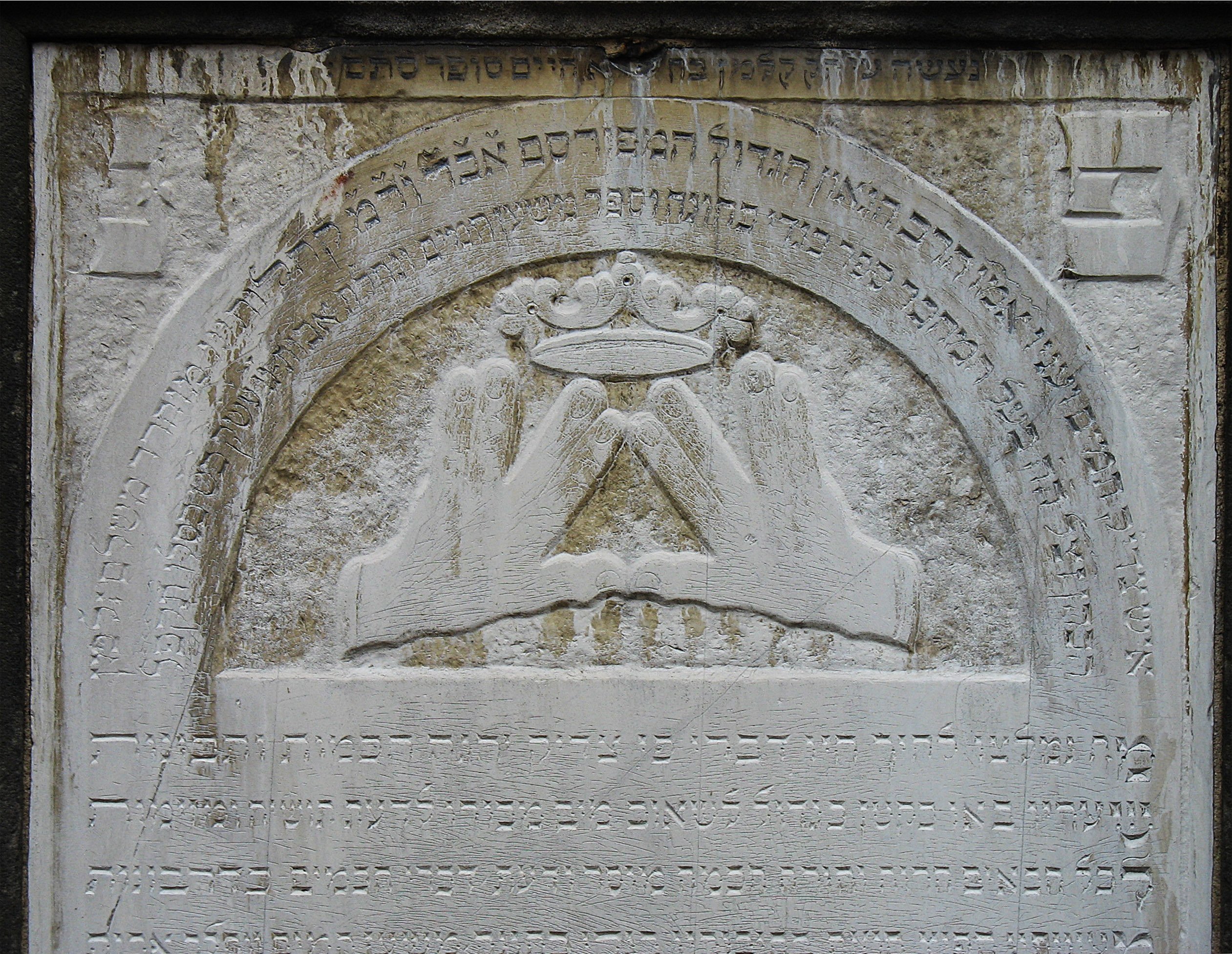
Blessing gesture depicted on the gravestone of Rabbi Meschullam Kohn (1739–1819), who was a kohen

=== Priestly blessing ===
The kohanim participating in an Orthodox and some other styles of traditional Jewish prayer service also deliver the priestly blessing during the repetition of the Amidah prayer. They perform this service by standing and facing the crowd in the front of the congregation, with their arms held outwards and their hands and fingers in a specific formation, with a Jewish prayer shawl or Talit covering their heads and outstretched hands so that their fingers cannot be seen. Kohanim living in Israel and many Sephardic Jews living in areas outside Israel deliver the priestly blessing daily; Ashkenazi Jews living outside Israel deliver it only on major Jewish holidays.

=== Pidyon haben (redemption of the firstborn) ===
Outside the synagogue, the kohen leads the pidyon haben ceremony. This redemption of the first born son is based on the Torah commandment, "all the first-born of man among thy sons shalt thou redeem".

=== Marital restrictions ===
Leviticus 21:7 prohibits marriage between a kohen and certain classes of women. According to rabbinic law, these classes include divorcees, non-Jews, converts (who were previously non-Jews), and women who have previously engaged in certain forbidden sexual relationships (even if involuntary, i.e., rape). If a kohen did have relations with any of these women, the offspring are described as "profaned" (male: challal, female: challalah); their status is nearly identical to a normal Jew, while the challalah herself is one of the categories which a kohen may not marry.

Rape poses an especially poignant problem. The pain experienced by the families of kohanim who were required to divorce their wives as the result of the rapes accompanying the capture of Jerusalem is alluded to in this Mishnah:

If a woman were imprisoned by non-Jews concerning money affairs, she is permitted to her husband, but if for some capital offense, she is forbidden to her husband. If a town were overcome by besieging troops, all women of priestly stock found in it are ineligible [to be married to priests or to remain married to priests], but if they had witnesses, even a male or female slave, these may be believed. But no man may be believed for himself. Rabbi Zechariah ben Hakatsab said, "By this Temple, her hand did not stir from my hand from the time the non-Jews entered Jerusalem until they went out." They said to him: No man may give evidence of himself.

Orthodox Judaism recognizes these rules as still binding, and Orthodox rabbis will not perform a marriage between a kohen and a divorced woman. This is the attitude of the Israeli rabbinate, with the result that a kohen cannot legally marry a divorced or converted woman in the State of Israel. (However, if such a marriage were performed outside Israel, it would be recognized as a valid marriage by the Israeli state.)

Conservative Judaism has issued an emergency takanah (rabbinical edict) temporarily suspending the application of the rules in their entirety, on the grounds that the high intermarriage rate threatens the survival of Judaism, and, hence, that any marriage between Jews is welcomed. The takanah declares that the offspring of such marriages are to be regarded as kohanim.

=== Other laws ===
To this day, kohanim keep the prohibition (Leviticus 21:1–4) against becoming ritually impure through proximity to a corpse (within the same room, at a cemetery, and elsewhere), except when the deceased is his immediate family member. Some Jewish cemeteries have special facilities to permit kohanim to participate in funerals or visit graves without becoming impure.

The presumption of priestly descent is used to help identify kohanim.

Other Jews are commanded to respect the priesthood in certain ways. One of these ways is that priests (and in their absence, occasionally Levites) are the first offered the opportunity to lead Birkat Hamazon. Unlike the general rule for aliyot, this offer — which is only a requirement according to some Rabbinic opinions — may be declined. There are other rules regarding the honoring of kohanim, even in the absence of the Temple, but generally these are waived (if they are even offered) by the kohen.

== Bat kohen ==
Kohen is a status that traditionally refers to men, passed from father to son. However, a bat kohen (the daughter of a priest) holds a special status in the Hebrew Bible and rabbinical texts. She is entitled to a number of rights and is encouraged to abide by specified requirements, for example, entitlement to consume some of the priestly gifts, and an increased value for her ketubah.

In modern times, Orthodox and many Conservative rabbis maintain the position that only a man can act as a kohen, and that a daughter of a kohen is recognized as a bat kohen only in those limited ways that have been identified in the past. Accordingly, in Orthodox Judaism only men can perform the Priestly Blessing and receive the first aliyah during the public Torah reading.

However, some Conservative rabbis give the kohen's daughter equal priestly status to a (male) kohen. As a result, some Conservative synagogues permit a kohen's daughter to perform the Priestly Blessing and the Pidyon HaBen ceremony, and to receive the first aliyah during the Torah reading.

Because most Reform and Reconstructionist temples have abolished traditional tribal distinctions, roles, and identities on grounds of egalitarianism, a special status for a bat kohen has very little significance in these movements.

== Genetics ==
Since the Y chromosome is inherited only from one's father (biological females have no Y chromosome), all direct male lineages share a common haplotype. Thus, if kohanim share a direct male lineage to Aaron, one would expect to see a high level of commonality among their Y chromosomes.

Since 1997, a number of genetic studies have been done on this topic, using testing data from across sectors of the Jewish and non-Jewish populations. The results of these studies have been interpreted by various parties as either confirming or disproving the traditions of uniform descent.

== Surnames ==
As both kohen status and (in many societies) last names are patrilineal, there is often a relationship between the two. But this is not always the case: although descendants of kohanim often bear surnames that reflect their genealogy, many families with the surname Cohen (or a variation) are not kohanim, nor even Jewish. Conversely, many kohanim do not have Cohen as a surname.

Names often associated with kohanim include:

- Cohen, also spelled Kahn
- Katz (Hebrew abbreviation of Kohen Tzedeq, "priest of justice"/"authentic priest")
- Maze, Mazo, Mazer (acronym of the Hebrew phrase mi zera Aharon hakohen, meaning "from the seed of Aaron the priest")
- Azoulay (acronym of the Hebrew phrase ishah zonah ve'challelah lo yikachu, meaning "a foreign [non-Israelite woman] or divorced [Israelite woman] shall not he take": a prohibition binding on kohanim, Leviticus 21:7)
- Kahane (Aramaic for kohen)

In contemporary Israel, "Moshe Cohen" is the equivalent of "John Smith" in English-speaking countries – i.e., proverbially the most common of names.

== Outside Judaism ==
According to the Church of Jesus Christ of Latter-day Saints, either "literal descendants of Aaron", or worthy Melchizedek priesthood holders have the legal right to constitute the Presiding Bishopric under the authority of the First Presidency (Section 68:16–20). To date, all men who have served on the Presiding Bishopric have been Melchizedek priesthood holders, and none have been publicly identified as descendants of Aaron. See also Mormonism and Judaism.

== In popular culture ==
The positioning of the kohen's hands during the Priestly Blessing was Leonard Nimoy's inspiration for Mr. Spock's Vulcan salute in the original Star Trek television series. Nimoy, raised an Orthodox Jew (but not a kohen), used the salute when saying, "Live long and prosper."

The Priestly Blessing was used by Leonard Cohen in his farewell blessing during "Whither Thou Goest", the closing song on his concerts. Leonard Cohen himself was from a kohen family. He also used the drawing of the Priestly Blessing as one of his logos.

== See also ==
- Samaritan High Priest
- Descent from antiquity
- Sayyid, a similar title for descendants of Mohammad in Islam
- Wicked Priest

== Bibliography ==
- Isaac Klein A Guide to Jewish Religious Practice, p. 387–388. (Conservative view prior to takkanah on kohen marriages.)
- Isaac Klein Responsa and Halakhic Studies, p. 22–26. (Conservative view prior to takkanah on kohen marriages.)
- Proceedings of the CJLS: 1927–1970, volume III, United Synagogue Book Service. (Conservative)
- Mishnayoth:Seder Nashim. Translated and Annotated by Philip Blackman. Judaica Press Ltd., 2000. pp. 134–135
