= Priestly robe =

Priestly robe may refer to:

- Alb, one of the liturgical vestments of Western Christianity
- Priestly robe (Judaism), one of the sacred articles of clothing of the High Priest of Israel
