= Priestly tunic =

One of several garments worn by priests in the Biblical temple

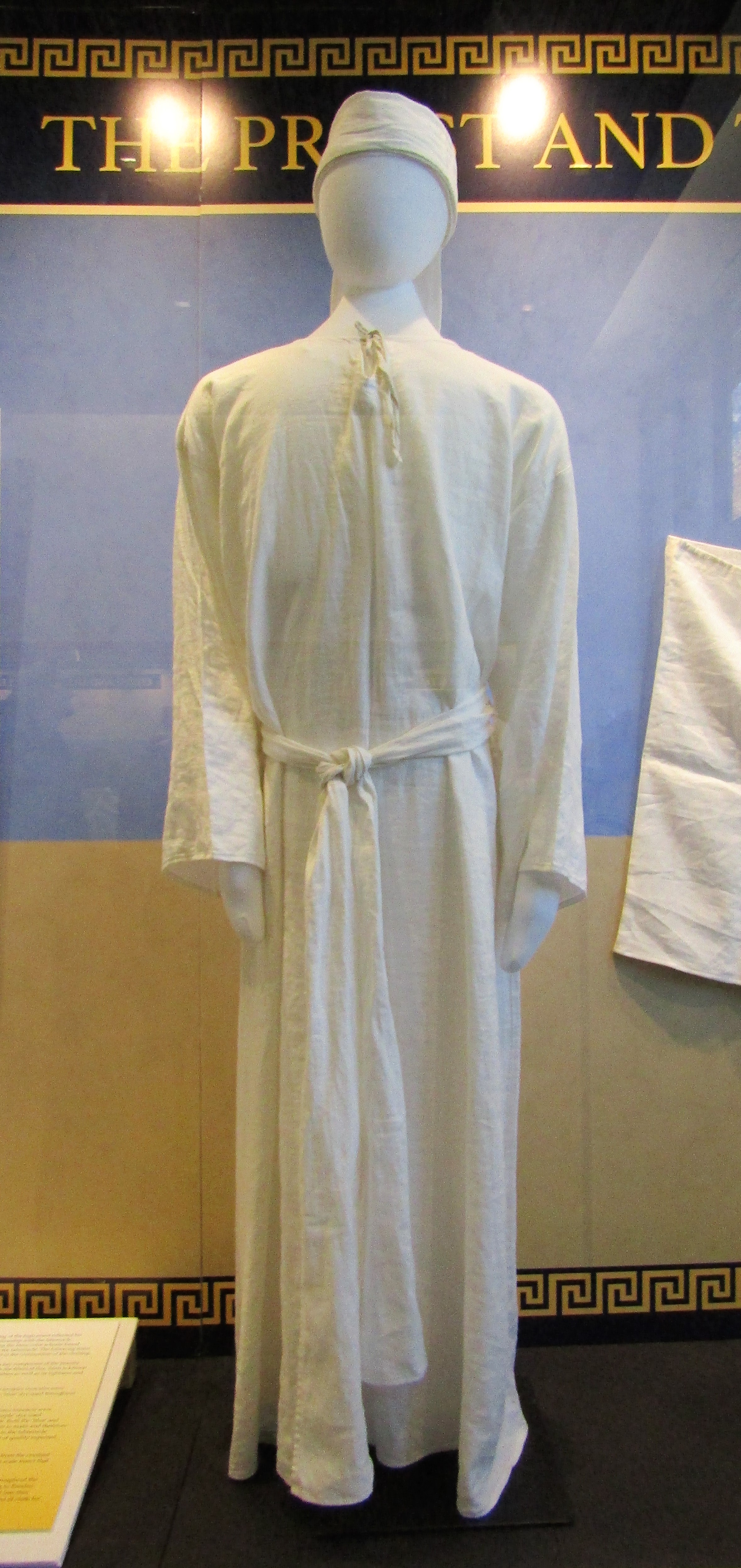
Priestly linens display for the Tabernacle replica at BYU.

The priestly tunic (Hebrew: כֻּתֹּנֶת kutonet) was an undergarment or shirt worn by all priests, including the High Priest, when serving in the Tabernacle and the Temple in Jerusalem.

== Etymology ==
The Hebrew noun kutónet (כֻּתֹּנֶת) is the generic term for a tunic in Hebrew. The first use is the "coats" of skins made for Adam and Eve in Eden, the best known use would be the coat of many colours of Joseph. It is related to, and may be the source of, the Greek noun kiton (chiton) "tunic."

== Instructions for making the tunic ==
It was made of pure linen, covering the entire body from the neck to the feet, with sleeves reaching to the wrists. That of the High Priest was embroidered (Exodus 28:39); those of the priests were plain (Exodus 28:40).

On the Day of Atonement, the High priest would change into a special tunic made of fine linen that was not embroidered when he would enter the Holy of Holies. This tunic could only be used once, with a new set made for each year.

According to the Talmud, the wearing of the tunic and the rest of the priestly garments atoned for the sin of bloodshed on the part of the Children of Israel (B.Zevachim 88b).

== See also ==
- Ephod
- Kittel
- Priestly breastplate
- Priestly golden head plate
- Priestly robe (Judaism)
- Priestly sash
- Priestly turban
- Priestly undergarments
