= Priestly undergarments =

Items of Jewish religious clothing

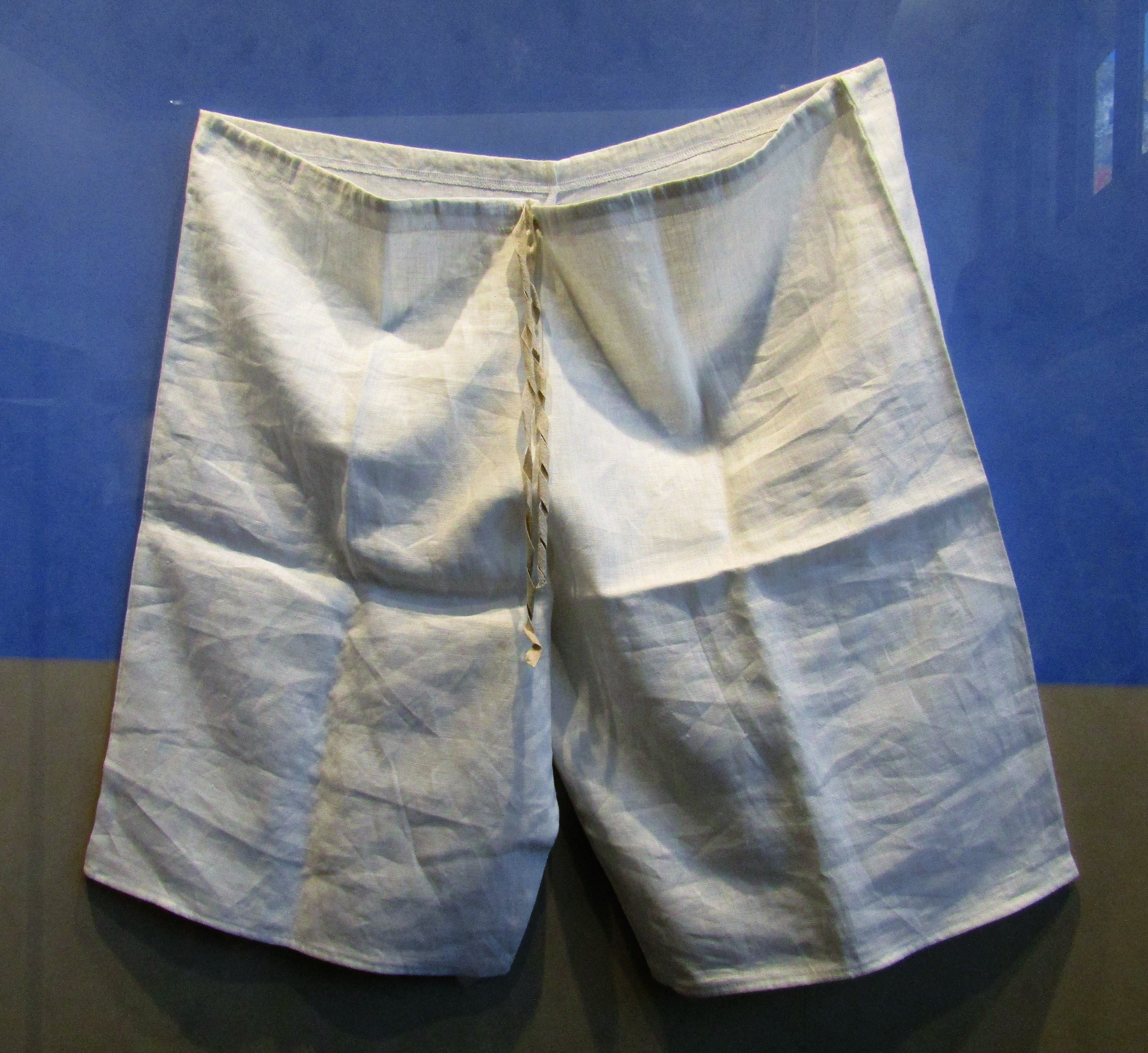
Priestly undergarments

The priestly undergarments (Biblical Hebrew: מִכְנְסֵי־בָד, romanized: miḵnəsē-ḇāḏ) were "linen breeches" (KJV) worn by the priests and the High Priest in ancient Israel. They reached from the waist to the knees and so were not visible, being entirely hidden by the priestly tunic.

== Hebrew Bible ==
The biblical commandment instituting their use is found in the Book of Exodus 28:42:

You shall also make for them linen breeches to cover their nakedness; they shall extend from the hips to the thighs.

Unlike the other priestly vestments which were "for glory and for beauty" (Exodus 28:2), the purpose of the michnasayim (mikhnesei bahd) was for modesty, "to hide their nakedness". In the Book of Leviticus when Moses consecrates Aaron and his sons as High Priest and priests, respectively, the linen undergarments are not mentioned (Leviticus 8:7, Leviticus 8:13), though their use is obviously presumed.

There were four holy garments worn by both the priests and the High Priest alike:

- Linen breeches to cover their nakedness when they enter the Tent of Meeting or approach the altar to officiate in the sanctuary.
- Priestly tunic, a fringed tunic made of fine linen, covering the entire body from the neck to the feet, with sleeves reaching to the wrists. That of the High Priest was embroidered (Exodus 28:39).
- Priestly sash of the High Priest was of linen with "embroidered work" (Exodus 28:39); sashes were made for other priests also.
- Priestly turban, according to Rabbinic literature that of the High Priest was much larger than that of the priests and wound so that it formed a broad, flat-topped turban; that for priests was wound so that it formed a cone-shaped turban, called a migbahat.

== Talmud ==
The Talmud records the worn out undergarments and priestly sashes were used for torch wicks in the Temple. The linen undergarments symbolized the abolition of the distinction between the heavenly and the mortal part of man, as contrasted with the divine nature, which is absolutely holy and living. According to the Talmud, the undergarments atone for the sin of sexual transgressions on the part of the Children of Israel (B.Zevachim 88b).

== See also ==
- Ephod
- Priestly breastplate
- Priestly golden head plate
- Priestly robe (Judaism)
- Priestly sash
- Priestly tunic
- Priestly turban
- Temple garment
