= High Priest of Israel =

Religious official of the Temple in Jerusalem

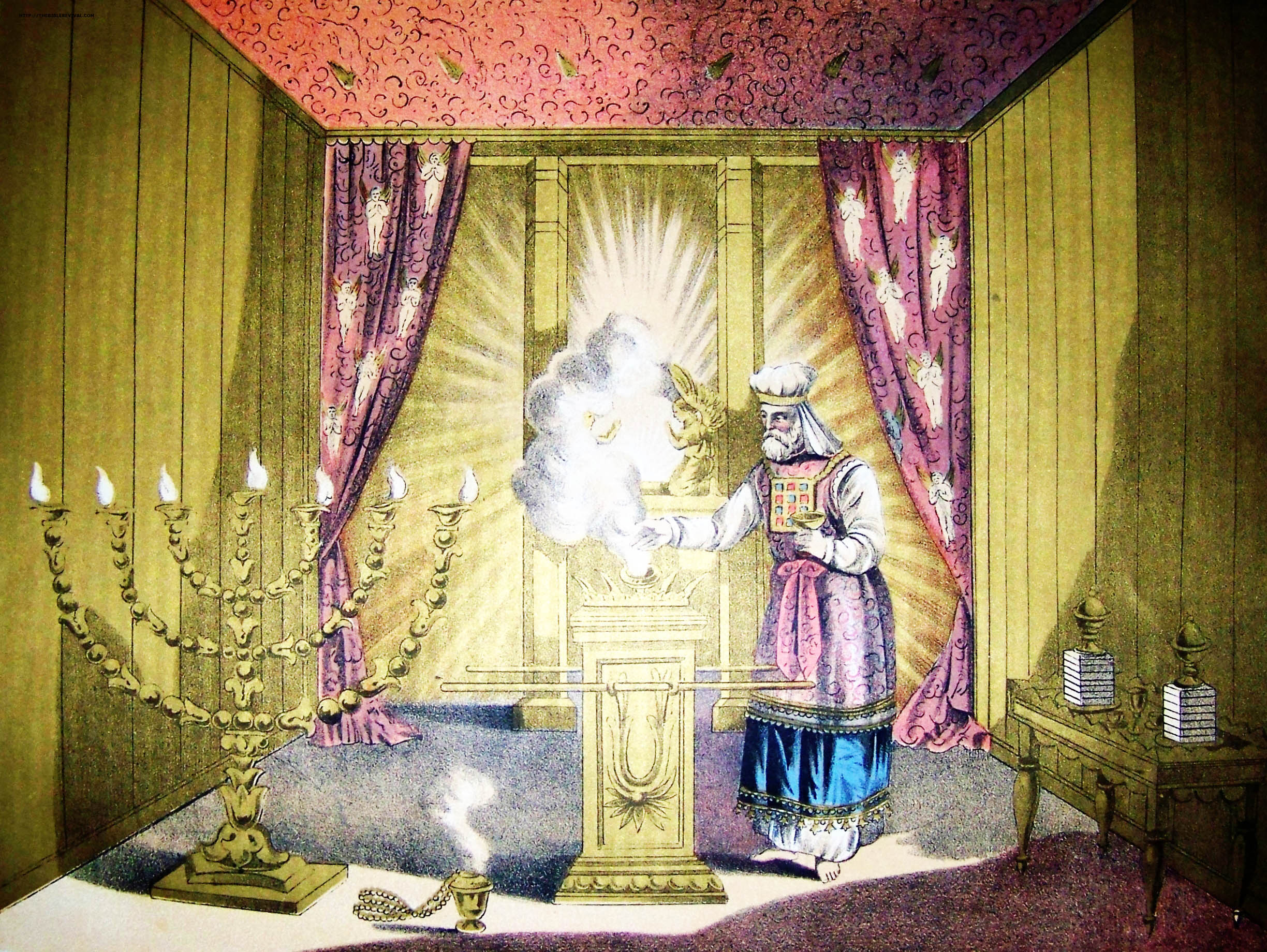
High Priest in the Holy Place.

The High Priest of Israel (Hebrew: כֹּהֵן גָּדוֹל, romanized: kōhēn gāḏōl, lit. 'great priest') was the head of the kohanim (Israelite priesthood). He played a unique role in the worship conducted in the Tabernacle and later in the Temple in Jerusalem, as well as in some non-ritual matters. Like all priests, he was required to be descended from Aaron, the first priest in the Torah. But unlike other priests, the high priest followed more restrictive laws, wore unique priestly garments, and was the only priest allowed to perform certain ceremonies.

There is still a Samaritan High Priest, but in Judaism, the High Priesthood is defunct.

== Titles ==
The high priest is referred to by a number of titles in the Hebrew Bible; the title kohen gadol did not become dominant until well into the Second Temple period.

In addition to the title of "great priest", which later became the standard Hebrew title, the term "head priest" (כֹּהֵן הָרֹאשׁ kōhēn hārōš) was used, as was "anointed priest" (כֹּהֵן מָשִׁיחַ kōhēn māšīaḥ). The Torah sometimes uses longer descriptions: "the great priest who was anointed with the holy oil" in Numbers 35:25, "the priest who was anointed and invested to serve in place of his father", in Leviticus 16:32 “the priest who is greater than his brothers, whom oil was poured on his head and who was invested to wear the garments" in Leviticus 21:10, and "the priest in place of him [Aaron] from his sons, who will come to the Tent of Meeting for the holy service" in Exodus 29:30.

Some verses refer by name to a specific individual who is understood to be "the" priest, i.e. the high priest at that moment.

== Hebrew Bible ==
=== Individuals ===
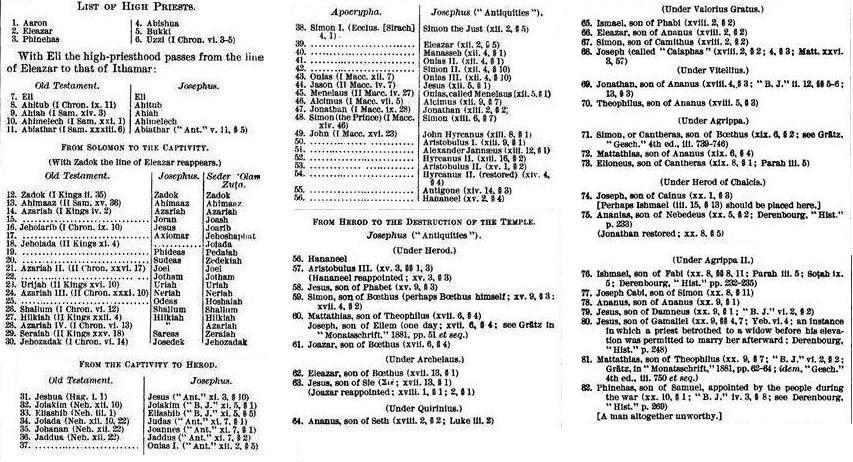
A traditional list of the Jewish high priests.

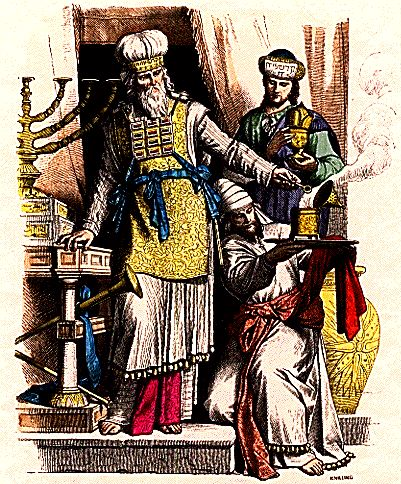
Jewish high priest and Levite in ancient Judah (the depictions of the Menorah, Table of Showbread and trumpets are inspired by the Arch of Titus).

The first high priest was Aaron himself, the ancestor of all priests; he was appointed to this role by Yahweh according to Exodus 28:1–2 and 29:4–5.

Other notable high priests in the Bible include Aaron's son Eleazar, Eleazar's son Phinehas, Eli, and Zadok.

After the Babylonian captivity, the first high priest was Joshua the High Priest, who is mentioned as a prominent leader alongside the political ruler Zerubbabel. Joshua was Tzadokite according to 1 Chronicles 5:38-40 and Haggai 2:2 in accordance with Ezekiel's prophecy.

It was presumed that the high priest's son would succeed him, but this did not always happen. The role eventually passed from Phinehas (or his descendants) to Eli, who was descended from Ithamar, brother of Eleazar. However, Eli's family eventually lost rights to the high priesthood due to their sin in 1 Samuel 2:27-35, a prophecy fulfilled when Solomon appointed Zadok, a descendant of Eleazar, in place of Abiathar, a descendant of Eli, according to 1 Kings 2:35 and 1 Chronicles 24:2–3.

Rabbinic Judaism supports the positions that Ezra was an ordinary member of the priesthood and that he actually served as a high priest.

=== Roles ===
The distinguished rank of the high priest is apparent from the fact that his sins are regarded as belonging also to the people. He was entrusted with the Urim and Thummim, which were worn in his garments.

On Yom Kippur, he alone performed the Yom Kippur Temple service, entering the Holy of Holies in the Temple in Jerusalem to atone for himself and for the people. Only he could offer the sacrifices for the sins of the entire people in Leviticus 4:16. He also offered a meal-offering twice daily, on behalf of himself and the whole priesthood in Leviticus 6:13-15, though the wording of the law is not altogether definite. An unintentional killer was required to remain in one of the Cities of Refuge until the death of the high priest, at which point the killer could return home in Numbers 35:25, 28, 32.

=== Qualifications ===
The high priest alone was anointed with holy anointing oil upon his consecration, hence the title of the "anointed priest" (though in the initial consecration of Aaron and his sons, all of them were anointed). The consecration also required wearing the special high priestly vestments for seven days.

He was required to strictly avoid ritual defilement. He was forbidden to come in contact with the bodies of the dead, not even those of his parents, according to Leviticus 21:11, unlike regular priests, who may become ritually impure for the death of an immediate relative according to Leviticus 21:1-3. He was also forbidden to leave his hair dishevelled or exposed, or to rend his garments as signs of mourning per Leviticus 21:10. He was permitted to marry only an Israelite virgin, and was forbidden to have any other sexual contact.

=== Vestments ===
The Torah provides for specific vestments to be worn by the priests when they are ministering in the Tabernacle. The high priest wore eight special garments. Of these, four were of the same type worn by all priests, and four were unique to the high priest.

Those vestments which were common to all priests were the priestly tunic, priestly sash, priestly turban, and priestly undergarments.

The vestments that were unique to the high priest were the priestly robe, ephod (vest or apron), priestly breastplate, and priestly golden head plate. In addition to the above "golden garments", he also had a set of white "linen garments" (bigdei ha-bad), which he wore only for the Yom Kippur Temple service.

== In rabbinic literature ==
Even though Aaron was the first high priest mentioned in the Book of Exodus, Louis Ginzberg in Legends of the Jews noted that in legends the first man that assumed the title of high priest of God is Enoch, who was succeeded by Methuselah, Lamech, Noah, Shem, Melchizedek, Abraham, Isaac and Levi.

The high priest is the chief of all the priests; he should be anointed and invested with the priestly garments; but if the sacred oil were not obtainable, investiture with the additional four garments is regarded as sufficient. A high priest so invested is known as merubbeh begadim. This investiture consists of arraying him in the eight pieces of dress and in removing them again on eight successive days, though (the anointing and) the investiture on the first day suffices to qualify him for the functions of the office. The only distinction between the "anointed" and the "invested" high priest is that the former offers the bull for an unintentional transgression.

The age of eligibility for the office is not fixed in the Torah; but according to rabbinical tradition it was twenty. (For comparison, Levites began working at age 30.) Josephus records that Onias III was succeeded by his brother Jason because Onias's son was too young (νήπιος néotios) to succeed his father; however, about 140 years later, Herod the Great ignored this minimum age limit and appointed Aristobulus High Priest at the age of 17, in an attempt to neutralize the power of the Hasmonean dynasty.

Legitimacy of birth and lineage was essential, hence the care in keeping genealogical records and distrust of one whose mother had been captured in war. According to Josephus, birth on foreign soil was no disqualification.

The high priest, like all priests, would minister barefoot when he was serving in the Temple. Like all priests, he had to immerse himself in the mikvah before vesting, and wash his hands and his feet before performing any sacred act. Neither common nor high priests could serve unless they wore their priestly vestments. It is further taught that just as the sacrifices facilitate an atonement for sin, so do the priestly garments.

Though other priests would serve only when it was their week on rotation and on festivals (and even then their function was decided by lot), the high priest could choose to perform any priestly rite at any time. Josephus contends that the high priest almost invariably participated in the ceremonies on Shabbat, Rosh Chodesh, and the three festivals. This may also be inferred from the glowing description given in the Wisdom of Sirach 1 of the high priest's appearance at the altar.

=== Powers ===
The Great Sanhedrin alone had the right to appoint, or confirm the appointment of, the high priest. His consecration could take place only in the daytime. Two high priests could not be appointed together. Every high priest had a deputy—called the segan (deputy), mishneh (second), or "memunneh" (appointed)—to stand at his right; another assistant was called the "Catholicos".

For offenses which entailed flagellation, the high priest could be sentenced by a court of three; after submitting to the penalty, he could resume his office. The high priest was expected to be superior to all other priests in physique, in wisdom, in dignity, and in material wealth; if he was poor, his brother priests contributed to make him rich; but none of these conditions was indispensable.

The high priest was required to be mindful of his honor. He was not allowed to mingle with the common people, nor permit himself to be seen disrobed, or in a public bath, etc.; but he could invite others to bathe with him. He was not allowed to participate in a public banquet, but he could pay a visit of consolation to mourners, though even then, his dignity was guarded by prescribed etiquette.

=== Restrictions ===
The high priest was not allowed to follow the bier of one in his own family who had died, nor leave the Temple or his house during the time of mourning. The people visited him to offer consolation; in receiving them, the Segan was at his right, the next in rank and the people at his left. The people said: "We are thy atonement." He answered: "Be ye blessed from heaven". During the offering of consolation he sat on a stool, the people on the floor; he rent his garments, not from above, but from below, near the feet, the penalty for rending them from above being flagellation. He could not permit his hair to be disheveled, nor could he cut it. He had one house attached to the Temple, and another in the city of Jerusalem. His honor required that he should spend most of his time in the Sanctuary, The high priest was subject to the jurisdiction of the courts, but if accused of a crime entailing capital punishment he was tried by the Great Sanhedrin; he could, however, refuse to give testimony.

The high priest needed to be married, and "should only marry a virgin"; to guard against contingencies, it was proposed to hold a second wife in readiness immediately before Yom Kippur; but he was to have only one wife at a time. He could perform halizah, and it could be given to his widow, as she also was subject to the Levirate; his divorced wife could marry again. When entering the Temple, he was supported to the curtain by three men. He could take part in the service whenever he desired. On Yom Kippur, he wore white garments, while on other occasions he wore his golden vestments. The seven days preceding Yom Kippur were devoted to preparing for his high function, precautions being taken to prevent any accident that might render him Levitically impure. The ceremonial for that day is described in detail in Mishnah Yoma.

=== Succession ===
The succession was to be through one of his sons, and was to remain in his own family. If he had no son, the office devolved upon the brother next of age: such appears to have been the practice in the Hasmonean period.

== Late Second Temple ==
In this period, the high priests belonged to priestly families from the sons of Zadok. This tradition came to an end in the 2nd century BCE during the rule of the Hasmoneans, when the position was occupied by other priestly families unrelated to Zadok.

After the Exile, the succession seems to have been, at first, in a direct line from father to son; but later the civil authorities arrogated to themselves the right of appointment. Antiochus IV Epiphanes for instance, deposed Onias III in favor of Jason, who was followed by Menelaus.

Beginning with the death of Zerubbabel, there was a tendency to combine political and priestly leadership in a single office; the final link in this development was the assumption of monarchy by the Hasmonean high priests after their successful revolt. But after Hasmonean national independence came to an end, the high-priesthood changed again in character, ceasing to be a hereditary and a life office. High priests were appointed and removed with great frequency. This may account for the references to multiple contemporaneous "high priests" (ἀρχιερεῖς) in Josephus. The deposed high priests seem to have retained the title, and to have continued to exercise certain functions. Even in the latest periods, the office was apparently restricted to a few families of great distinction (probably the benei kohanim gedolim, "[members of] high-priestly families").

Herod the Great nominated no less than six high priests; Archelaus, two. The Roman legate Quirinius and his successors exercised the right of appointment, as did Agrippa I, Herod of Chalcis, and Agrippa II. Even the people occasionally elected candidates to the office. The high priests before the Exile were apparently appointed for life; in fact, from Aaron to the exile fewer high priests served than in the 60 years preceding the fall of the Second Temple.

Josephus enumerates only 52 high priests under the Second Temple, omitting the second appointments of Hyrcanus II, Hananeel, and Joazar.

=== Connection with Sanhedrin ===
The high priest was the presiding officer of the Sanhedrin. This view conflicts with the later Jewish tradition according to which the Pharisee tannaim (the Zugot) at the head of the yeshivot presided over the great Sanhedrin also (Ḥag. ii. 2). However, a careful reading of the sources ("Ant." xx. 10; "Contra Ap." ii., § 22; comp. "Ant." iv. 8, § 14; xiv. 9, §§ 3–5 [Hyrcanus II. as president]; xx. 9, § 1 [Ananus]), as well as the fact that in the post-Maccabean period the high priest was looked upon as exercising in all things, political, legal, and sacerdotal, the supreme authority, shows it to be almost certain that the presidency of the Sanhedrin was vested in the high priest (see Isidore Loeb in "R. E. J." 1889, xix. 188–201; Jelski, "Die Innere Einrichtung des Grossen Synhedrions", pp. 22–28, according to whom the Nasi was the high priest, while the Av Beth Din was a Pharisaic tanna).

== See also ==
- List of high priests of Israel
- Samaritan High Priest

== Bibliography ==
- Schulz, Sarah (2023). Joschua und Melchisedek. Berlin: De Gruyter. ISBN 9783110793413.
