= Priestly robe (Judaism) =

Jewish sacred article of clothing

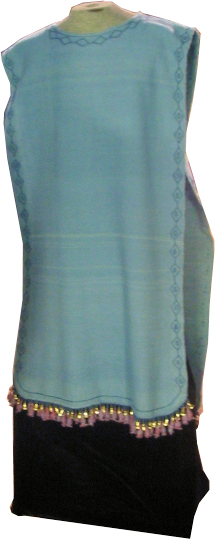
The robe of the High Priest of Israel as created by the Temple Institute.

The priestly robe (Hebrew: מְעִיל, romanized: məʿil), sometimes robe of the ephod (מְעִיל הָאֵפֹוד məʿil hāʾēp̄oḏ), is one of the sacred articles of clothing of the High Priest of Israel. The robe is described in Exodus 28:31-35. It was worn under the ephod. Like all the priestly garments, it was to be made by 'gifted artisans ... filled with the spirit of wisdom'.

== Hebrew Bible ==
This Hebrew noun occurs 30 times in the Masoretic Text of the Hebrew Bible (𝕸) and refers not only to the robe of the high priest but also any robe worn over a tunic by men of rank, such as the robe Jonathan gave to David, or his mantle which Job tore in desperation, and also the outer cloak of women, such as the robe worn by David's daughters.

It was a sleeveless, purple-blue or violet robe, woven in a single piece. The opening in the center for the High Priest's head to pass through was woven, not cut or torn (Exodus 28:32). The lower hem of the garment was fringed with small golden bells alternating with pomegranate-shaped tassels of blue (turquoise), purple and scarlet wool (Exodus 28:33–34).

The golden bells were a necessity, and they must ring when the High Priest entered the Holy of Holies on the Yom Kippur, lest he die (Exodus 28:35).

== Rabbinical commentary ==
Rashi deduced a law for all the priestly vestments: “From the negative one can derive the positive: if he will have them he will not be liable for death; thus, if he enters lacking one of these garments he is liable for death at the hands of Heaven.” Maimonides rules likewise.

Rashi points out in his commentary on the Talmud that the fashioning and wearing of the priestly robe atoned for the sin of lashon hara on the part of the Israelites in Zevachim 88b. As the High Priest walked, the bells noisily announced his presence, and because the noise emanated from the robe, it served as a reminder for people to refrain from gossip.

The Talmud also states that the tassels between each bell on the robe were made of turquoise, purple, and scarlet wool. These three materials signify the three people injured when Lashon Hara is spoken: the speaker, the listener, and the one who is talked about.

== See also ==
- Ephod
- Kittel
- Priestly breastplate
- Priestly golden head plate
- Priestly sash
- Priestly tunic
- Priestly turban
- Priestly undergarments
- Tetzaveh
