= Priestly golden head plate =

Plate worn by the Jewish High Priest

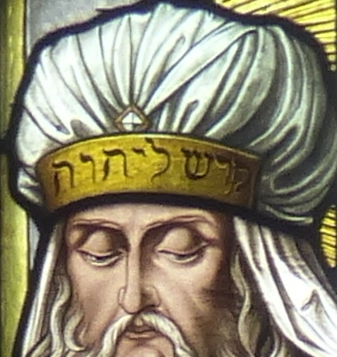
The golden head-plate in stained glass at Kollegiatstift Eisgarn, Austria

The priestly golden head plate, crown or frontlet (Hebrew: צִיץ, romanized: ṣīṣ) was the golden plate or tiara worn by the Jewish High Priest on his mitre or turban whenever he would minister in the Tabernacle or the Temple in Jerusalem.

== Etymology ==
The root tzitz (צִיץ) means “to blossom” or “a flower” and as such is employed by the picturesque metaphors in Isaiah 27:6, 28:1, 40:7-8, floral descriptions of Solomon’s Temple (1 Kings 6:18-35) and the blooming of Aaron’s rod (Num. 17:23). This latter instance is particularly interesting, because just as a tzitz appeared on the Aaron’s rod so is the Aaronic High Priest supposed to wear a tzitz on his forehead. In addition to this, once in the Hebrew Bible, in Ezekiel 8:3, the word appears in the construction tzitzit rosh meaning “a mop of hair” and probably deriving from the metaphor of hair as the plants grown from skin. This is furthermore supported by a handful of rabbinic descriptions which compare the priestly tzitz to a flower in Shabbat 63b and Sukkah 5a.

The Greek Septuagint renders the word in Exodus 28:36 and elsewhere petalos (πέταλος), "blossom," from which the English "petal" derives.

== Hebrew Bible ==
The commandment regarding the crown is found in Exodus 28:36–38:

36 And thou shalt make a plate of pure gold, and engrave upon it, like the engravings of a signet: HOLY TO THE LORD. 37 And thou shalt put it on a thread of blue, and it shall be upon the mitre; upon the forefront of the mitre it shall be. 38 And it shall be upon Aaron's forehead, and Aaron shall bear the iniquity committed in the holy things, which the children of Israel shall hallow, even in all their holy gifts; and it shall be always upon his forehead, that they may be accepted before the LORD.

The tzitz was a small, rectangular plate of solid gold, engraved in Hebrew letters with "HOLINESS TO THE LORD," (קדשליהוה Qodeš l-YHWH) and having holes drilled in each of the four corners through which blue cords were threaded (Exodus 39:31) which held the tiara onto the High Priest's priestly turban. Traditionally, it is understood that one set of cords went around the High Priest's head at the base of the tiara, and the other went over the forehead, all meeting at the back of the head to hold the tiara in place.

Exodus 39:30 refers to the tziytz as the "holy crown".

== Talmud ==
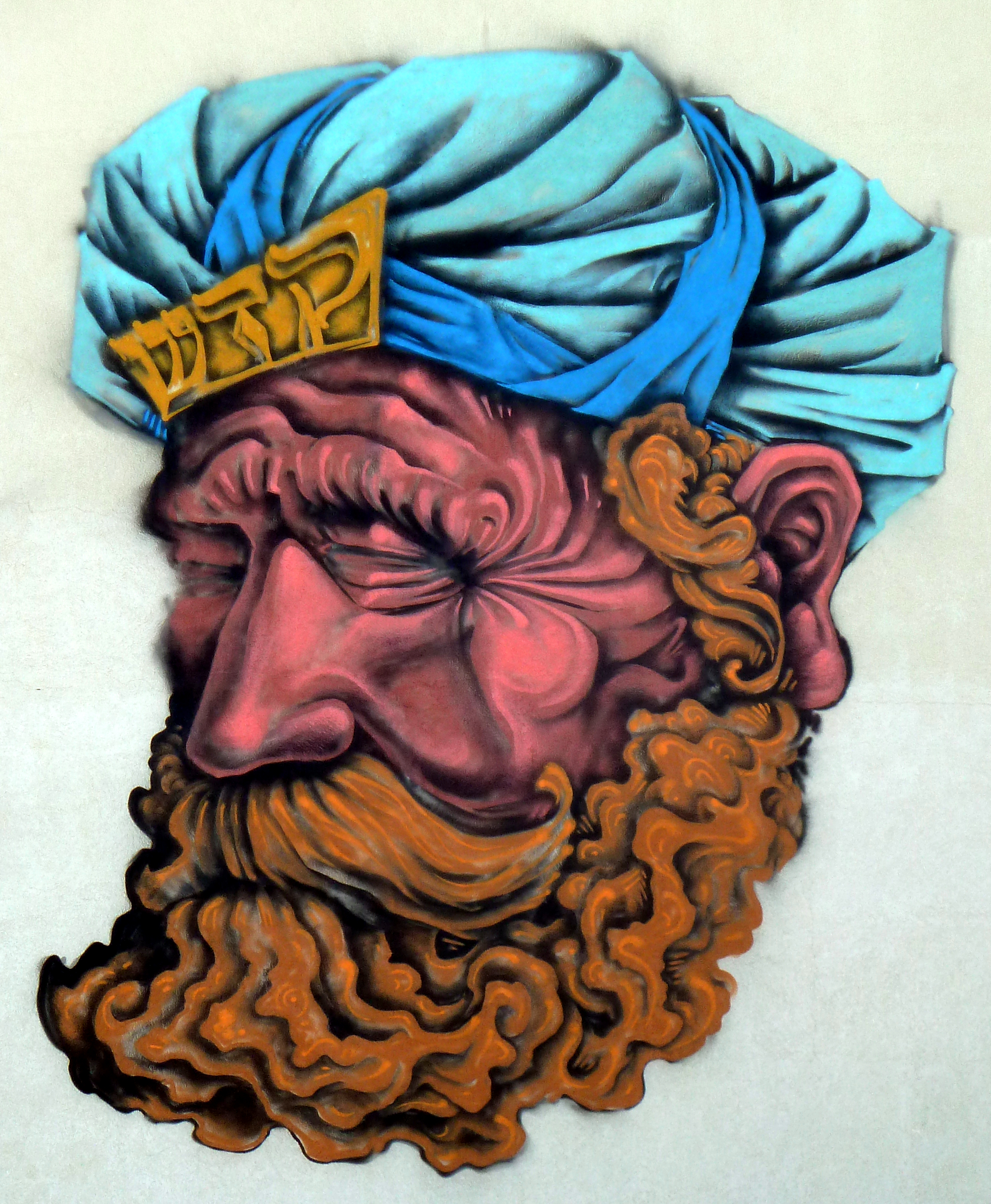
Street art of the high priest with headplate, with the first part of the required inscription "קדש" (qodeš, "holy"), Jerusalem.

According to the Talmud, the wearing of the golden frontlet atoned for the sin of arrogance on the part of the Children of Israel (B.Zevachim 88b) and it symbolizes that the high priest bears the lack of all the offerings and gifts of the sons of Israel. And it must be constantly on his head for the good pleasure of God towards them (Exodus 28:38).

The Talmud in Shabbat 63b describes the tziytz as encircling the High Priest's forehead “from one ear to the other.” Rabbi Abraham Isaac Kook suggested that this emphasis on the High Priest's ears — organs for listening — indicates that he needed to be particularly "receptive to the inner voice of elevated thought."

== See also ==
- Ephod
- Priestly breastplate
- Priestly robe (Judaism)
- Priestly sash
- Priestly tunic
- Priestly turban
- Priestly undergarments
- Tetzaveh
