= Priestly turban =

Head covering worn by the High Priest of Israel inside the Temple in Jerusalem

The priestly turban or mitre (Hebrew: מִצְנֶפֶת, romanized: miṣnep̄eṯ) was the head covering worn by the High Priest of Israel when he served in the Tabernacle and the Temple in Jerusalem.

== Etymology ==
The Hebrew term for the priestly turban has been translated as "mitre" (KJV) or "headdress". It was most likely a turban, as the word comes from the root "to wrap".

== Hebrew Bible ==
The turban worn by the High Priest was much larger than the head coverings of the priests. It was wound so that it formed a broad, flat-topped turban, resembling the blossom of a flower. The head covering of the priests was different, being wound so that it formed a cone-shaped turban, called a mīgbāʿā (מִגְבָּעָה). It was made of fine linen in Exodus 28:39, and like all the holy garments, it was made by "gifted artisans ... filled with the spirit of wisdom" according to Exodus 28:3. Rashi writes that the High Priests' turban was identical to the turbans of the other priests.

The priestly golden head plate (Hebrew: צִיץ, romanized: ṣīṣ, lit. 'blossom, flower') was attached to the turban using two sets of blue cords: one going over the top of the head and the other around the sides of the head at the level of the ears according to Exodus 39:31.

== Talmud ==
According to the Talmud, the wearing of the turban atoned for the sin of arrogance on the part of the Israelites according to Zevachim 88b.

== Gallery ==
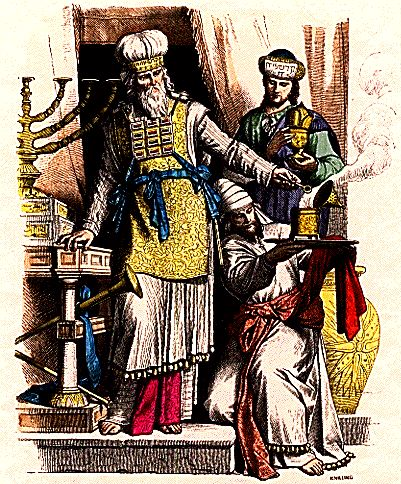
The High Priest of Israel in his golden garments wearing the turban on his head. The priest on one knee beside him is wearing it wrapped conically, which was called a mig̲bāʿā.

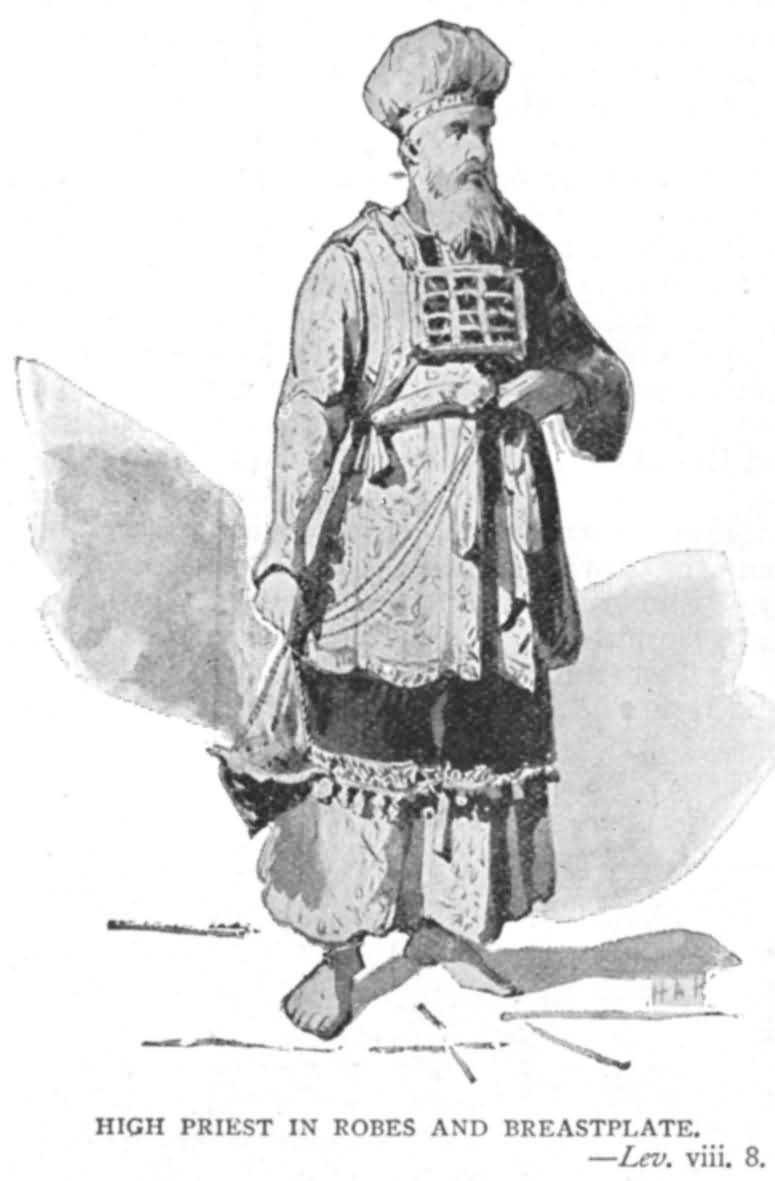
Another view of the turban.

== See also ==
- Ephod
- Priestly breastplate
- Priestly robe (Judaism)
- Priestly sash
- Priestly tunic
- Priestly undergarments
