= Priestly sash =

Ancient Jewish religious garment

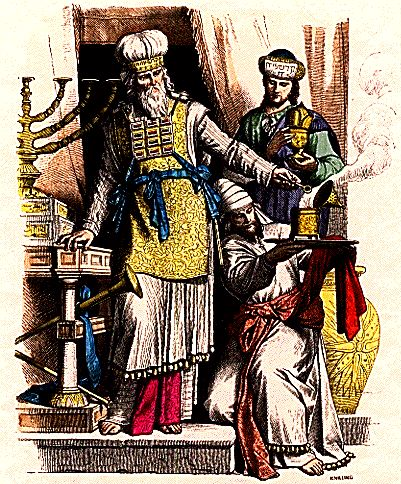
The High Priest of Israel wearing the sacred vestments; the ends are shown in red hanging at his feet. The kohen on one knee beside him is wearing an avnet wound around his waist.

The priestly sash or girdle (Biblical Hebrew: אַבְנֵט, romanized: ʾab̲nēṭ) was part of the ritual garments worn by the High Priest of Israel

The "sash" or "girdle" worn by the High Priest was of fine linen with embroidered work in tekhelet (a blue color), purple, and biblical scarlet according to Exodus 28:39 and 39:29; those worn by the priests were of white, twined linen. It was distinct from the embroidered belt of the ephod.

Like the other priestly vestments, the purpose of the sash was "for glory and for beauty" (Exodus 28:41). On the Day of Atonement the High Priest changed into special linen garments that included a sash of fine linen without any embroidery (Leviticus 16:4). These linen garments were worn only once, with new ones being made each year.

== Rabbinical commentary ==
According to Rabbinical literature, Midrash and Maimonides, the sash was 32 cubits long and 2, 3 or 4 fingers wide. At this length, it would have to have been wound around the body several times. Theories differ as to how this was accomplished: some say it was wound around the waist only, while others say it was wound around the waist and over the shoulders, crossing over the heart. In any event, the ends would have been tied and allowed to hang down in front. According to the Talmud, the wearing of the sash atoned for "sins of the heart" (impure thoughts) on the part of the Children of Israel.

== See also ==
- Ephod
- Priestly breastplate
- Priestly golden head plate
- Priestly robe (Judaism)
- Priestly tunic
- Priestly turban
- Priestly undergarments
