= Ephod =

Garment worn by the high priest in ancient Israel

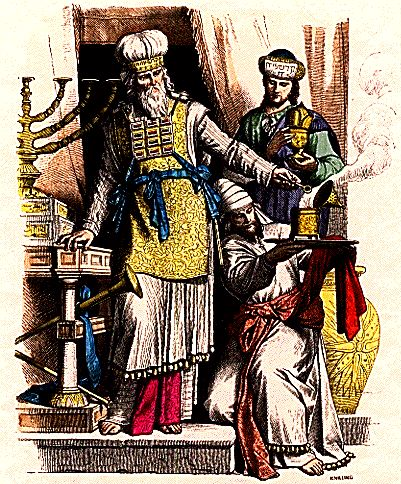
High Priest of Israel wearing the sacred vestments. The ephod is depicted here in yellow.

An ephod (Hebrew: אֵפוֹד, romanized: ʾēp̄ōḏ; /ˈɛfɒd/ or /ˈiːfɒd/) was a type of apron that, according to the Hebrew Bible, was worn by the High Priest of Israel. It was a revered artifact in ancient Israelite culture, and was closely connected with oracular practices and priestly ritual.

In the Books of Samuel and Books of Chronicles, David is described as wearing an ephod when dancing in the presence of the Ark of the Covenant (2 Samuel 6:14, 1 Chronicles 15:27) and one is described as standing in the sanctuary at Nob, with a sword behind it (1 Samuel 21:9). In the book of Exodus and the Book of Leviticus, one is described as being created for the High Priest to wear as part of his official vestments (Exodus 28:4+, 29:5, 39:2+; Leviticus 8:7).

== Description ==
In the Bible, in the contexts where it is worn, the ephod is usually described as being linen, but did not constitute complete clothing of any kind, as the Books of Samuel describe. 1 Chronicles 15 states that David was "clothed with a robe of fine linen, as were all the Levites who bore the ark... [and] David also wore an ephod of linen," and 2 Samuel 6:14 that "David was wearing a linen ephod". There appears to have been a strong religious and ceremonial implication to wearing an ephod, since the 85 priests at Nob are specifically identified as being the type of people who wore an ephod; though the Masoretic Text here describes them as being linen ephods (1 Samuel 22:18) the word "linen" is not present in the Septuagint version of the passage, nor is it present when the Septuagint describes David and Samuel as girding themselves with an ephod. Therefore, some textual scholars regard its presence in the Masoretic Text as a later editorial gloss.

== Wearing and composition ==
A passage in the Book of Exodus describes the Ephod as an elaborate garment worn by the high priest, and upon which the Priestly breastplate containing the Urim and Thummim rested. According to this description, the Ephod was woven out of gold, blue, purple, and scarlet threads, was made of fine linen and was embroidered with skillful work in gold thread (Exodus 28:6–14). Gideon is additionally described as creating an ephod made up of 1700 shekels of gold (Judges 8:25–27). Tractate Yoma 72a argues that each of the textures was combined in six threads with a seventh of gold leaf, making 28 threads to the texture in total.

The biblical description (Exodus 28:16, 39:9) continues describing the size of the breastplate which is affixed to the front of the ephod as a square measuring one span by one span (the width of an outstretched hand from little finger tip to outstretched thumb tip). Stating that it was held together by a girdle, and had two shoulder straps which were fastened to the front of the ephod by golden rings, to which the breastplate was attached by golden chains (Exodus 28:6–14). From this description, it appears to have been something like an apron or skirt with braces, though Rashi argued that it was like a woman's riding girdle. The biblical description also adds that there were two engraved gems over the shoulder straps like epaulettes made from shoham, usually translated as "onyx", and with the names of the 12 tribes written upon them. The classical rabbinical sources differ as to the order in which the tribes were named on the jewels (Sotah 36a).

== Origins ==
Critical textual scholars attribute the description of the Ephod in Exodus to the priestly source and a date later than the other mentions of the ephod; biblical scholars believe that the ephod may have evolved into this highly ceremonial form from more primitive beginnings (the simple linen form described in the Books of Samuel), much like how the highly liturgical maniple evolved from an ordinary handkerchief.

== Extended uses ==
Besides its use as a garment, an Ephod was also used for oracular purposes, in conjunction with Urim and Thummim; the Books of Samuel imply that whenever Saul or David wished to question God via oracular methods, they asked a priest for the ephod. Since the oracular process is considered by scholars to have been one of cleromancy, with the Urim and Thummim being the objects which were drawn as lots, the ephod is considered by scholars to have been some form of container for the Urim and Thummim; to harmonise this with the descriptions of the ephod as a garment, it is necessary to conclude that the ephod must have originally been some sort of pocket, which the priests girded to themselves. However, the biblical text states the Urim and Thummim were placed in the breastplate, not the ephod, in Leviticus 8:8. The integration of the stones in the breastplate, as well as the Hebrew usage of Urim as "lights," suggest that the Urim and Thummim may have been a type of ocular device through which the priest would look when receiving divine communication.

The object at Nob, which must have been somewhat freestanding since another object was kept behind it, and the objects made by Gideon and by Micah from molten gold, logically cannot have just been garments. The object made by Gideon is plainly described as having been worshipped, and therefore the cult image of a deity, while the object made by Micah is closely associated with a teraphim, and the ephod and teraphim are described interchangeably with the Hebrew terms pesel and massekah, meaning graven image, and molten image, respectively.

Even the ephods used for oracular purposes were not necessarily just pieces of cloth, as they are not described as being worn, but carried (though some translations render 1 Samuel 2:28 as "wear an ephod'" rather than "carry an ephod"); the Hebrew term used in these passages for "carry" specifically implies that the ephod was carried either in the hand or on the shoulder. The conclusion thus is that the ephod in these cases referred to a portable idol the lots were cast in front of. Some scholars have suggested that the connection between the idol and the garment is that the idol was originally clothed in a linen garment, and the term ephod gradually came to describe the idol as a whole.

According to the Talmud, the wearing of the ephod atoned for the sin of idolatry on the part of the Israelites.

Gideon went on to make an ephod out of the gold won in battle; according to Ginzberg's The Legends of the Jews: "In the high priest's breastplate, Joseph was represented among the twelve tribes by Ephraim alone, not by Manasseh, too. To wipe out this slight upon his own tribe, Gideon made an ephod bearing the name of Manasseh. He consecrated it to God, but after his death homage was paid to it as an idol. In those days the Israelites were so addicted to the worship of Beelzebub that they constantly carried small images of this god with them in their pockets, and every now and then they were in the habit of bringing the image forth and kissing it fervently." According to the Bible, this action eventually caused the whole of Israel to turn away from God yet again and the ruin of Gideon and his family. Gideon had 70 sons from the many women he took as wives. He also had a Shechemite concubine who bore him a son he named Abimelech, which means "my father is king" (Judges 8:31).

== In apocryphal literature ==
According to the ancient apocryphal Lives of the Prophets, after the death of Zechariah ben Jehoiada, the priests of the Temple could no longer see the apparitions of the angel of the Lord, make divinations with the Ephod, or give responses from the Holy of Holies.

== See also ==
- Priestly breastplate
- Priestly golden head plate
- Priestly robe (Judaism)
- Priestly sash
- Priestly tunic
- Priestly turban
- Priestly undergarments
- Tetzaveh
