= Zevachim =

First tractate of Seder Kodashim

Zevachim (Hebrew: זְבָחִים; lit. "Sacrifices") is the first tractate of Seder Kodashim ("Holy Things") of the Mishnah, the Talmud and the Tosefta. This tractate discusses the topics related to the sacrificial system of the Temple in Jerusalem, namely the laws for animal and bird offerings, and the conditions which make them acceptable or not, as specified in the Torah, primarily in the book of Leviticus (Lev 1:2 and on). The tractate has fourteen chapters divided into 101 mishnayot, or paragraphs. There is a Gemara – rabbinical commentary and analysis – for this tractate in the Babylonian Talmud, and no Gemara in the Jerusalem Talmud.

The fifth chapter of Mishnah Zevachim Chapter 5 of Zevachim is recited in the daily morning prayer service. (It was included in the siddur at this stage because it discusses all the sacrifices and the sages do not dispute within it.) It goes as follows:

- A. Eizehu mekoman shel z'vachim Places for the zevachim korbanot to be offered: "...The slaughter of the bull and the he-goat of Yom Kippur is in the north [of the altar]..."
- B. Parim hanisrafim Bulls that are completely burned: "...These are burned in the place where the [altar] ashes are deposited."
- C. Chatot hatzibur v'hayachid Sin offerings of the community and the individual: "...The he-goats...are eaten within the [Temple courtyard] curtains by male priests...until midnight."
- D. Ha'olah qodesh qodashim The elevation offering is among the offerings with a major-degree-of-holiness: "...it is entirely consumed by fire."
- E. Zivchei shalmei tzibur v'ashamot Communal peace offerings and guilt offerings: "...are eaten within the [Temple courtyard] by males of the priesthood...until midnight."
- F. Hatodah v'eil nazir qodashim kalim The thanksgiving offering and the ram of a Nazirite are offerings of a minor-degree holiness: "They are eaten throughout the city [of Jerusalem] by anyone, prepared in any manner...until midnight..."
- G. Sh'lamim qodashim kalim The peace offerings are of lesser (lighter) holiness: "...Is eaten by the kohanim...throughout the city [of Jerusalem] by anyone..."
- H. Hab'chor vehama'aser vehapesach qodashim kalim The firstborn and tithe of animals and the Passover offering are offerings of lesser (lighter) holiness: "...The Passover offering is eaten only at night...only if roasted."
