= Priesthood (ancient Israel) =

Males who were patrilineal descendants of Aaron

The priesthood of ancient Israel was the class of male individuals, who, according to the Hebrew Bible, were patrilineal descendants from Aaron (the elder brother of Moses) and they were assisted by the tribe of Levi, who served in the Tabernacle, Solomon's Temple and Second Temple until the destruction of Jerusalem in 70 CE. Their temple role included animal sacrifice. The priests (Hebrew kohanim) are viewed as continuing in the Kohen families of rabbinical Judaism. The Levites were not technically priests, they were the priests assistants and are viewed as continuing in the Levite families of rabbinical Judaism.

== Hebrew Bible ==
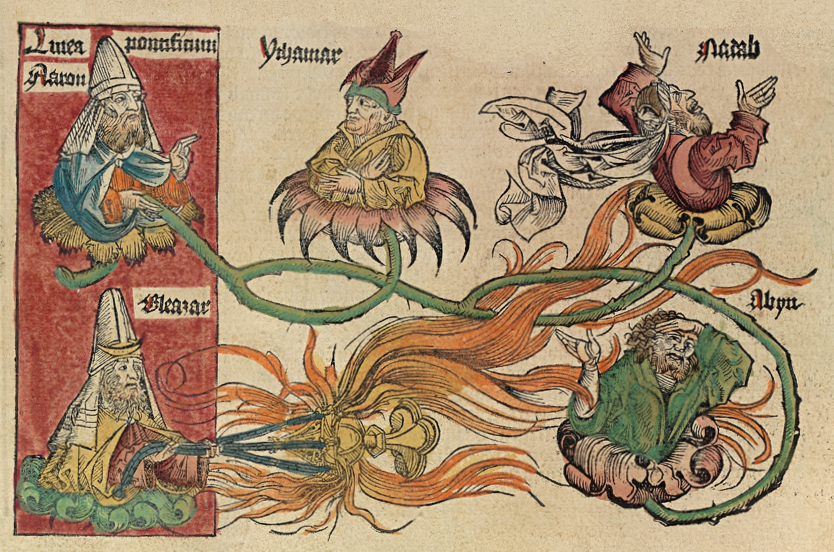
Illustration of Aaron's lineage from the 1493 Nuremberg Chronicle.

The earliest priest mentioned in the Bible, Melchizedek, was a priest of the Most High and a contemporary of Abram. The first priest mentioned of another god is Potipherah priest of On, whose daughter Asenath married Joseph in Egypt. The third priest to be mentioned is Jethro, priest of Midian, and Moses' father in law.

The first mention of an Israelite priesthood occurs in Exodus 40:15: "And thou shalt anoint them, as thou didst anoint their father [Aaron], that they may minister unto me in the priest's office: for their anointing shall surely be an everlasting priesthood throughout their generations." (KJV, 1611) Among these priests a High Priest was anointed (first mentioned in Leviticus 21:10), to serve in unique functions, such as entering the Holy of Holies once yearly on the Day of Atonement. The priesthood was associated with the tribe of Levi, from whom Aaron descended.

=== Sacrifices and rituals ===
The Israelite priests were to officiate at many offerings prescribed under the Law of Moses, including the burnt offering, meal offering, dough offering, sin offering, guilt offering, release of the scapegoat, peace offering, heave offering, drink offering, incense offering, thank offering, etc., throughout the liturgical year. In addition, they would engage in many different rituals, such as the priestly blessing, the red heifer, the redemption of the firstborn, and various purification rituals.

=== Garments ===
The garments of the Israelite priests and high priests are described, and prescribed, in detail in Leviticus. For the high priest these include a priestly tunic, linen undergarments, sash, robe, priestly turban, ephod (with Urim and Thummim), and a priestly breastplate with 12 stones representing the twelve tribes of Israel. The priests served in rotating priestly divisions.

== Critical scholarship ==
The starting point of much critical scholarship of the priesthood in ancient Israel is the thesis of Julius Wellhausen that biblical Israelite history is redacted and represents three stages:

1. non Levitical priests
2. Levitical priests
3. Aaronids and Levites

However, Wellhausen's views depend on some critical, but unproven, assumptions, and some scholars consider that the study of the cult and priesthood of ancient Israel is still in its infancy compared to other areas of biblical studies.
