= Law of Moses =

Torah, or first five books of the Hebrew Bible

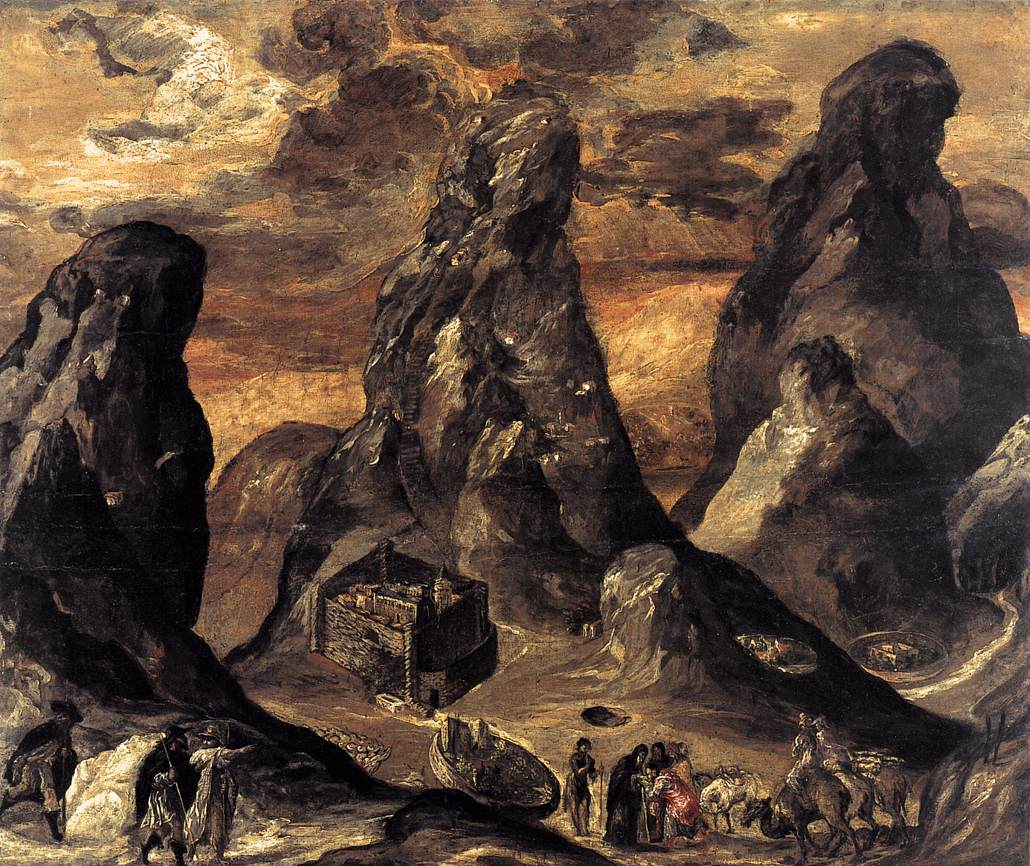
El Greco's View of Mount Sinai (1570–1572), Historical Museum of Crete

The Law of Moses (Hebrew: תֹּורַת מֹשֶׁה, romanized: Torat Moshe), also called the Mosaic Law, is the law said to have been revealed to Moses by God. The term primarily refers to the Torah or the first five books of the Hebrew Bible.

According to the Torah, this set of laws forms one side of the covenant between the Jewish people and God, known as the Mosaic covenant or Sinaitic covenant (after the biblical Mount Sinai).

== Terminology ==
The Law of Moses or Torah of Moses (Hebrew: תֹּורַת מֹשֶׁה, romanized: Torat Moshe; Septuagint Ancient Greek: νόμος Μωυσῆ, romanized: nómos Mōusē; or in some translations the "Teachings of Moses") is a biblical term first found in the Book of Joshua 8:31–32, where Joshua writes the Hebrew words of "תֹּורַת מֹשֶׁה" (Torat Moshe) on an altar of stones at Mount Ebal. The text continues:

And afterward he read all the words of the teachings, the blessings and cursings, according to all that is written in the book of the Torah.

— Joshua 8:34

The term occurs 15 times in the Hebrew Bible, a further seven times in the New Testament, and repeatedly in Second Temple period, intertestamental, rabbinical and patristic literature.

The Hebrew word for the first five books of the Hebrew Bible, Torah (which means "law" and was translated into Greek as "nomos" or "Law") refers to the same five books termed in English "Pentateuch" (from Latinised Greek "five books", implying the five books of Moses). According to some scholars, use of the name "Torah" to designate the "Five Books of Moses" of the Hebrew Bible is clearly documented only from the 2nd century BCE.

In modern usage, Torah can refer to the first five books of the Tanakh, as the Hebrew Bible is commonly called, to the instructions and commandments found in the 2nd to 5th books of the Hebrew Bible, and also to the entire Tanakh and even all of the Oral Law as well. Among English-speaking Christians the term "The Law" can refer to the whole Pentateuch including Genesis, but this is generally in relation to the New Testament where nomos "the Law" sometimes refers to all five books, including Genesis. This use of the Hebrew term "Torah" (law) for the first five books is considered misleading by 21st-century Christian bible scholar John Van Seters, because the Pentateuch "consists of about one half law and the other half narrative".

== Law in the Ancient Near East ==
The "Law of Moses" in ancient Israel was different from other legal codes in the ancient Near East because transgressions were seen as offences against God rather than solely as offences against society (civil law). This contrasts with the Sumerian Code of Ur-Nammu (c. 2100–2050 BCE), and the Babylonian Code of Hammurabi (c. 1760 BCE, of which almost half concerns contract law).

However, the influence of the ancient Near Eastern legal tradition on the Law of ancient Israel is recognised and well documented, for example, in principles such as lex talionis ("eye for an eye"), and in the content of the provisions. Some similarities are striking, such as in the provisions concerning a man-goring ox (Code of Hammurabi laws 250–252, Exodus 21:28–32). Some writers have posited direct influence: David P. Wright, for example, asserts that the Covenant Code is "directly, primarily, and throughout dependent upon the Laws of Hammurabi", "a creative rewriting of Mesopotamian sources to be viewed as an academic abstraction rather than a digest of laws". Others posit indirect influence, such as via Aramaic or Phoenician intermediaries. There is consensus that the similarities are a result of inheriting common oral traditions. Another example, the Israelite Sabbatical Year has antecedents in the Akkadian mesharum edicts granting periodic relief to the poor. An important distinction, however, is that in ancient Near East legal codes, as in more recently unearthed Ugaritic texts, an important, and ultimate, role in the legal process was assigned to the king. Ancient Israel, before the monarchic period beginning with David, was set up as a theocracy, rather than a monarchy, although God is most commonly portrayed like a king.

== Hebrew Bible ==
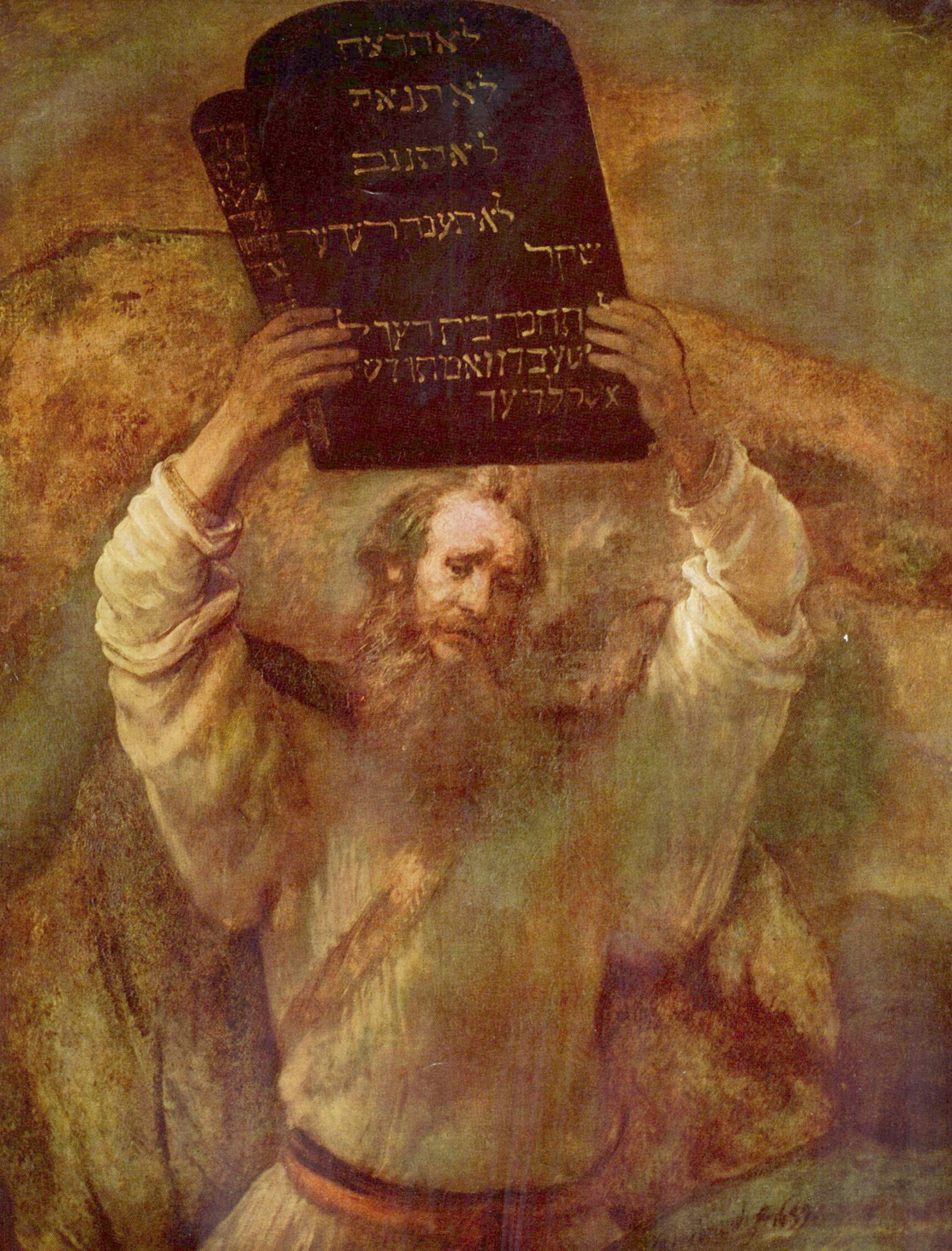
"Moses with the Ten Commandments" by Rembrandt (1659)

=== Moses and authorship of the Law ===
According to the Hebrew Bible, Moses led the early Israelites out of slavery in Egypt, and thereafter God established the Mosaic covenant with the Israelites and their descendants. Based on historical records and archaeological evidence, most scholars agree the Biblical account (which was written centuries later than its narrative setting) has some historical basis, although there is little of historical fact in it. Traditionally the first five books of the Hebrew Bible are attributed to Moses, though most modern scholars believe there were multiple authors. The law attributed to Moses, specifically the laws set out in the books of Leviticus and Deuteronomy came to be considered supreme over all other sources of authority (any king and/or his officials), and the Levites became the guardians and interpreters of the law.

The Book of Deuteronomy (Deuteronomy 31:24–26) depicts Moses saying, "Take this book of the law, and put it by the side of the Ark of the Covenant of the LORD". Similar passages referring to the Law include, for example, Exodus 24:4, "And Moses wrote all the words of the LORD, and rose up early in the morning, and built an altar under the mount, and twelve pillars, according to the twelve tribes of Israel; Exodus 34:27, "And the LORD said unto Moses, Write thou these words, for after the tenor of these words I have made a covenant with thee and with Israel; and Leviticus 26:46 "These are the decrees, the laws and the regulations that the LORD established on Mount Sinai between himself and the Israelites through Moses." According to the biblical narrative, the Book of the Covenant, recording all the commands of the LORD, was written by Moses in the desert and read to the people, and to seal the covenant, the blood of sacrificial oxen was then sprinkled, half on an altar and half on the people.

=== Later references to the Law in the Hebrew Bible ===
The Book of Kings relates how a "law of Moses" was discovered in the Temple during the reign of king Josiah (r. 641–609 BCE).

Another mention of the "Book of the Law of Moses" is found in Joshua 8:30–31.

=== Content ===
The content of the Law is spread among the books of Exodus, Leviticus, and Numbers, and then reiterated and added to in Deuteronomy. This includes:

- The Ten Commandments
- Moral laws – on murder, theft, honesty, sexual ethics, etc.
- Social laws – on property, inheritance, marriage, and divorce.
- Food laws – on what is clean and unclean, on cooking and storing food.
- Purity laws – on menstruation, seminal emissions, skin disease and mildew, etc.
- Feasts – the Day of Atonement, Passover, Feast of Tabernacles, Feast of Unleavened Bread, Feast of Weeks, etc.
- Sacrifices and offerings – the sin offering, burnt offering, whole offering, heave offering, Passover sacrifice, meal offering, wave offering, peace offering, drink offering, thank offering, dough offering, incense offering, red heifer, scapegoat, first fruits, etc.
- Instructions for the priesthood and the high priest, including tithes.
- Instructions regarding the Tabernacle, and which were later applied to the Temple in Jerusalem, including those concerning the Holy of Holies containing the Ark of the Covenant (in which were the tablets of the law, Aaron's rod, the manna). Instructions and for the construction of various altars.
- Forward looking instructions for time when Israel would demand a king.

== In Judaism ==
The content of the instructions and its interpretations, the Oral Torah, was passed down orally, excerpted and codified in Rabbinical Judaism, and in the Talmud were numbered as the 613 commandments. The law given to Moses at Sinai (Hebrew: הלכה למשה מסיני, romanized: Halakhah le-Moshe mi-Sinai) is a halakhic distinction.

A tenet of Judaism is that the Law of Moses applies only to the Jewish people.

== In Christianity ==
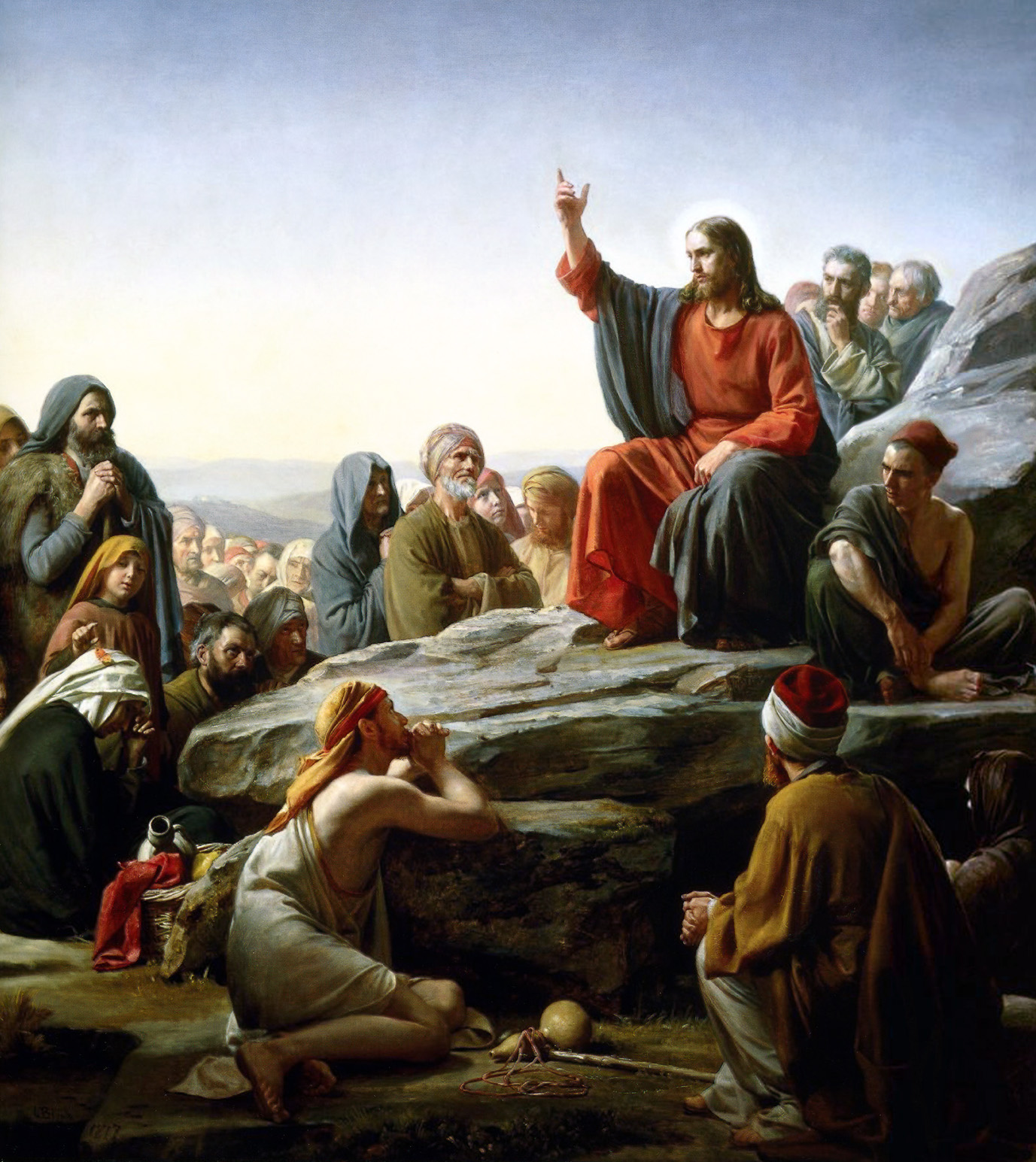
A depiction of the famous Sermon on the Mount of Jesus in which he commented on the Old Covenant. Christians believe that Jesus is the mediator of the New Covenant. Painting by Carl Heinrich Bloch, Danish painter, d. 1890.

The Law of Moses, which Christians generally refer to as the Old Covenant (Christians believe that Jesus mediates the New Covenant), played an important role in the origins of Christianity. It was a source of serious dispute and contention, as seen in Jesus' expounding of the Law during his Sermon on the Mount, the circumcision controversy in early Christianity, and the Incident at Antioch, which led scholars to dispute the relationship between Paul of Tarsus and Judaism. The Book of Acts says that after the ascension of Jesus, Stephen, the first Christian martyr, was killed when he was accused of speaking against the Second Temple and the Mosaic Law. Later, in Acts 15:1–21, the Council of Jerusalem addressed the circumcision controversy in early Christianity.

Orthodox Christians regard the Law of Moses as still fully in effect but transformed and fulfilled in a number of ways. Other Christians believe that only parts dealing with the moral law (as opposed to ceremonial law) are still applicable, others believe that none apply, dual-covenant theologians believe that the Old Covenant remains valid only for Jews, and a minority have the view that all parts still apply to believers in Jesus and in the New Covenant without any transformation in their character. Hebrew Catholics believe that the Law of Moses is not obligatory for Christians, but yet beneficial to preserve the Jewish identity of those Jews who have become Catholic, and as a devotional.

During the Enlightenment, European society transitioned from the religious traditional social order of the Middle Ages into the modern Age of Reason. Anti-semitism, once driven by religious conviction and the persistent belief that Jews should be blamed for the death of Jesus, was reconfigured. The influence of Hebrew scripture and authoritarian ritual practice on Christian orthodoxy (including the Catholic Church) became the basis for attacks on Church authority. Anti-Semitic polemic against the Mosaic Law became a common theme for many well-known Enlightenment philosophers. Pierre Bayle, a deist, criticized the biblical figures from the Old Testament and their adherence to religious law which he said operated in an authoritarian manner to regulate social and community behavior instead of a personal conscience that requires agency.

== In Islam ==
Muslims believe Moses was one of the major prophets (and apostles) of God and the Law was one of the three major revealed scriptures known by name beside the Quran, which mentions the Law or Torah a total of eighteen times, and repeats commandments from it:

How do they (the Jews) make you (Muhammad) judge when [they have] the Law ("Torah") with them, wherein are the commandments of God? Even then they turn away [from God], after all that. They are no believers. Indeed have We sent down the Law ("Torah"), wherein was guidance and light, by which the prophets, who submitted to God, used to govern ("judge") those who [now] are of the Jewish folk. So did the Rabbis and religious scribes by what of the Scripture of God they were entrusted with and were witnesses to. So fear not the men but fear Me and trade not My verses (commandments) for a petty price [of this worldly life]. Whoever governs ("judges") not by what God has sent down: they are those [who are] the unbelievers. We ordained for them therein: life for life, eye for eye, nose for nose, ear for ear, tooth for tooth and an [equal] retribution [for] wounds. But whoever is charitable with it, then be it [counted as] his atonement. And whoever governs not by what God has sent down: they are those [who are] the wrong-doers. And We followed up upon their footsteps Jesus the son of Mary verifying what was before him of the Law. And We gave him the Gospel ("Evangel"), wherein was guidance and light, verifying what was before him of the Law, a guidance and an admonition for the pious.

— Quran 5:43–46

== See also ==
- Matthew 5: Antitheses
- Moses in Islam
- Covenant theology
- Covenantal nomism
