= Slaughter offering =

Type of animal sacrifice in Judaism

A slaughter offering in the Hebrew Bible (Hebrew: זֶבַח, romanized: zeḇaḥ) is a type of Jewish animal sacrifice. The term specifically refers to the slaughter of an animal to God followed by a feast or a meal. This is distinguished from the burnt offering, shechita, guilt offering, sin offering, korban sacrifice, and the gift offering (Hebrew minchah).

A common subcategory of this is the peace offering (Hebrew: Zevaḥ shelamim). Although shelamim is usually translated into English as peace-offering, the Hebrew word shalom, derived from the Semitic root Š-L-M, means much more than the English word "peace", and includes the concepts of harmony, health, and prosperity.

== Etymology ==
Zevakh is derived from the Semitic root Z-B-Ḥ; the qal is זָבַח zāb̲aḥ means "to slaughter;" the piʿel (causative) form means "to sacrifice."

== Types and occasions ==
There are three different subdivisions of slaughter offering:

- Thank offering (Hebrew todah) - made in response to an unexpected positive change in circumstance
- Votive offering - made in response to a positive change in circumstance, when a vow in hope of such a change had previously been made
- Free-will offering - more spontaneous slaughter offerings

Slaughter offerings were also made in response to the ratification of solemn covenants, treaties, and alliances.

== Ritual ==
As the meal resulting from a slaughter offering was seen as holy, the guests were required to change their garments if possible; impurity would have excluded them from participation. Sometimes festive garments, which were seen as having sanctity, were borrowed for this purpose from the priests, and rings, having the significance of amulets, were worn in honour of the deity. Like the other types of sacrifice, the act began with the imposition of the offerer's hands onto the sacrificial animal, which would then be killed, and its blood collected and sprinkled upon the altar; however, slaughter offerings could be killed anywhere within the Temple Courtyard, not only on the north side of the altar. Oxen, sheep, and goats, are explicitly identified by the Biblical text as being used for slaughter offerings, but unlike other types of sacrifice, there was no rigid insistence that the animal be unblemished, or on the gender of the animal.

The fat of the animal was the portion allocated to Yahweh, and was burnt on the altar; the priests were allocated the breast and right shoulder, which was first waved around the altar (making this portion a wave offering); the remainder went to the offerer. The meat had to be consumed within a certain time limit; praise offerings had to be consumed on the day of the sacrifice, while other types of slaughter offering had to be consumed by the day afterward; any leftovers had to be destroyed on the third day, outside the camp. The offerer was permitted to invite guests to consume the meal with him, along with strangers, paupers, servants, and Levites, as long as they were all ritually clean. The meals were treated as a joyful occasion, and would be accompanied with wine, as well as bread (both leavened and unleavened), oil, and salt.

== Origin ==
Exactly what the term peace (in sacrifice-of-peace offering) refers to is a matter of debate, as is whether the deity was seen as a guest at the meal or as the host. Some scholars hold that the sacrifice-of-peace offering was a covenant of friendship expressing community between God and the people, and among the people themselves; that these groups were at peace with one another. Others claim that it is an attempt to balance the books when positive events occur, attributed to God, by favouring God with a meal, or by fulfilling a vow previously made, as appropriate to the situation; that rehabilitation is achieved and the people restored to perfection (make perfect being a possible meaning of shelamim). In the latter of these possibilities, and partly in the former, the sacrifice is regarded as for God, and hence that the people are merely guests at the meal.

However, what is generally considered the most likely explanation, is that sacrifice-of-peace offerings simply originated as meals, the consumption of which directly improved health (as opposed to starvation), and hence indirectly improved prosperity (shelamim being understood to mean prosperity/health). When sanctuaries outside Jerusalem began to be suppressed, and eventually outlawed by Josiah, the impracticality of going to Jerusalem to sacrifice an animal simply to consume meat, led to killing an animal for food gaining an independent existence from the sacrifice-of-peace offering.

The concentration of these sacrifices, the main offering given by private individuals, at a single sanctuary evidently resulted in such large numbers of offers that the space on the north side of the altar, where the animals were killed in the other types of sacrifices, became cramped, hence the specific permit for sacrifice-of-peace offerings were to be killed anywhere within the sanctuary courtyard. How exactly a portion of the resulting meat was given to God appears to have varied; though the regulations of the Priestly Code point to God's portion being burnt on the altar, Gideon is described in the Book of Judges, a text which textual scholars believe has a much earlier date than Leviticus, as pouring out broth, made from the meat of the sacrifice, as a libation.
