= Burnt offering (Judaism) =

Sacrifice described in the Hebrew Bible

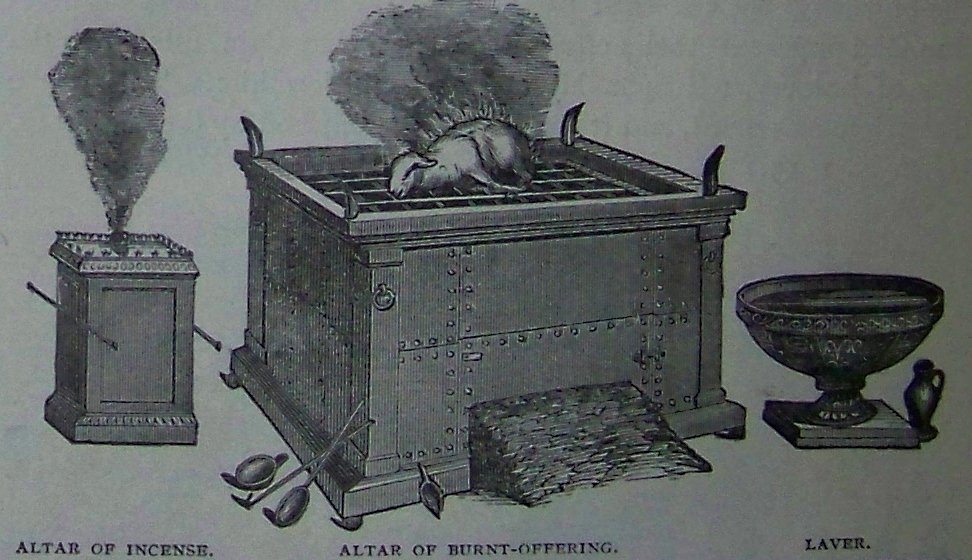
The Altar of Incense, Altar of Burnt-Offering, and Laver from the Biblical Tabernacle; illustration from the 1890 Holman Bible

A burnt offering in Judaism (Hebrew: קָרְבַּן עוֹלָה, qorban ʿōlā) is a form of sacrifice first described in the Hebrew Bible. As a tribute to God, a burnt offering was entirely burnt on the altar. This is in contrast to other forms of sacrifice (entitled zevach or zevach shelamim), which was partly burnt and most of it eaten in communion at a sacrificial meal.

During the First Temple and Second Temple periods, offerings took place twice daily offered on the altar as a burnt animal in the temple in Jerusalem that was completely consumed by fire. The skin of the animal, however, was not burnt but given to the priests respective of their priestly division. These skins are listed as one of the twenty-four priestly gifts in Tosefta Hallah (or Tosefta Challah).

== Etymology ==
The Hebrew noun olah (עֹלָה) occurs 289 times in the Masoretic Text of the Hebrew Bible. It means "that which goes up [in smoke]". It is formed from the active participle of the verb alah (עָלָה), "to cause to ascend." It was sometimes also called kalil, an associated word found in Leviticus, meaning "entire".

Its traditional name in English is "holocaust", and the word olah has traditionally been translated as "burnt offering." The term was translated as holocauston in the Septuagint. Today, some English Bible translations render the word as holocaust, and others translate it as "burnt offering". For example, Exodus 18:12a is translated in the New American Bible as Then Jethro, the father-in-law of Moses, brought a holocaust and other sacrifices to God, while it is translated in the New International Version as Then Jethro, Moses' father-in-law, brought a burnt offering and other sacrifices to God.

In classical rabbinical literature, there are several different etymologies given for the term olah, though all agree that it literally translates as (that which) goes up. Some classical rabbis argued that the term referred to ascent of the mind after making the sacrifice, implying that the sacrifice was for atonement for evil thoughts, while others argued that it was a sacrifice to the highest, because it is entirely intended for God. Modern scholars, however, argue that it simply refers to the burning process, as the meat goes up in flames.

== Hebrew Bible ==
=== In Biblical narrative ===
The first uses of the olah for burnt offering refer to the sacrifices of Noah "of every clean beast, and of every clean fowl, and offered burnt offerings on the altar", and to the near-sacrifice of Isaac by Abraham: "offer him there for a burnt offering upon one of the mountains". Another burnt-offering is that of Jethro, Moses' father-in-law (Exodus 18:12).

The Nevi'im section of the Hebrew Bible, particularly passages in the Book of Judges, presents the practice of the burnt offering. In the story of Gideon, a slaughter offering of a young goat and unleavened bread is consumed by fire sent from heaven. In the story of Samson's birth, his father, who was intending to make a slaughter offering so that he could give a meal to an angel, is told by the angel to burn it completely instead.

=== Procedure ===
Initially, the burnt-offering was required to be offered on an "altar of earth". After the tabernacle was built, it was specified that the tabernacle's altar be used.

The major types of sacrificial offerings, their purpose and circumstances, details of their performance and distributions afterwards are delineated in the Book of Leviticus 1:1-7:38.

The animals were required to be "unblemished"; the list of blemishes includes animals "that are blind or broken or maimed, or have an ulcer or eczema or scabs". The animals were brought to the north side of the altar, and ritually slaughtered. The animal's blood was carefully collected by a priest and sprinkled on the outside corners of the altar. Unless the animal was a bird, its carcass was flayed, with the skin kept by the priests.

The flesh of the animal was divided according to detailed instructions given by the Talmud (Tamid 31), and would then be placed on the wood on the altar (which was constantly on fire due to the large number of sacrifices carried out daily), and slowly burnt. After the flesh (including any horns and goats' beards) had been reduced to ashes, usually the following morning, the ashes were removed by a Kohen, as refuse, and taken to a ritually clean location outside the Temple.

The burnt-offering was offered together with a meal offering and a drink offering, whose quantities depended on the variety of animal being offered (bull, ram, sheep, or goat).

=== Occasions ===
The schedule of obligatory sacrifices, including burnt-offerings, appears in the Book of Numbers 28:1-30:1. These include daily offerings, as well as additional offerings for Shabbat, Rosh Chodesh, Rosh Hashanah, Passover, Shavuot, Yom Kippur, and Sukkot. The sacrificial animals were required to be bulls, rams, goats (as sin offerings) and lambs.

A korban olah was also made as a sin offering on the appointment of a priest, on the termination of a Nazirite's vow, after recovery from tzaraath, by a woman after childbirth, after recovery from a state of abnormal bodily discharges, a gentile's conversion to Judaism, or as a voluntary sacrifice, when the sacrificial animal could be a young bull, ram, year-old goat, turtle doves, or pigeons.

== In Hellenistic Judaism ==
The Septuagint mainly translates the Hebrew olah with the common Greek term holokaustos, a traditional Greek religious practice in which the sacrificial victim was reduced to ash rather than parts consumed in a meal; for example, in Genesis 22:2, Isaac is to be sacrificed "as a holocaust" (Greek: εἰς ὁλοκάρπωσιν). Josephus uses the term both for Abraham and Isaac, but also in relation to the human sacrifice by Ahaz of his son to Baal. The practice is also referenced by Philo, but with significant changes.

== In Rabbinic Judaism ==
Chazal sources, 3rd-6th century CE, portray the olah form of sacrifice, in which no meat was left over for consumption by the Kohanim, as the greatest form of sacrifice and was the form of sacrifice permitted by Judaism to be sacrificed at the Temple by the Kohanim on behalf of both Jews and non-Jews.

=== The priestly gifts ===
Unless the offering was a bird (olat haof), its corpse was flayed. The skin of the offering was then kept by the priests who were serving their shift as part of the rotation of the priestly divisions. The Tosefta narrates that, as time evolved, more powerful priests forcibly took possession of the skins from the lesser priests. Subsequently, it was decreed by the Beth din shel Kohanim (the court of the priests in Jerusalem) that the skins should be sold, with the monetary proceeds being given to the Temple in Jerusalem (Tosefta 19).

== Modern scholarship ==
Some passages in the Book of Judges show the principle and practice of whole offerings; in the story of Gideon, a slaughter offering of a young goat and unleavened bread is destroyed when fire sent from heaven consumes it; in the story of Samson's birth, his father, who was intending to make a slaughter offering so that he could give a meal to an angel, is told by the angel to burn it completely instead.

The burnt offering is believed to have appeared as an extreme form of the slaughter offering, whereby the portion allocated to the deity increased to all of it. In slaughter offerings, the portion allocated to the deity was mainly the fat, the part which can most easily be burnt (fat is quite combustible); scholars believe it was felt that the deity, being aethereal, would appreciate aethereal food more than solid food—the burning of the fatty parts of animals being to produce smoke as a sweet savour for the deity.
