= Nazirite =

Person who took the vows of Numbers 6:1–21

In the Hebrew Bible, a nazirite or a nazarite (Hebrew: נָזִיר Nāzīr) is an Israelite man or woman who voluntarily took a vow which is described in Numbers 6:1–21. This vow required the nazirite to:

- Abstain from wine and strong drink as well as all other grape products, such as vinegar
- Refrain from cutting the hair on his head
- Not to become ritually impure by contact with corpses or graves, even those of family members.

After following these requirements for a designated time period (which would be specified in the individual's vow), the nazirite would offer a specific animal sacrifice; along with it, the nazirite's hair was to be shorn and burned.

The nazirite is described as being "holy" and "holy unto God"; yet at the same time, he or she must bring a sin offering. This has led to divergent approaches to the nazirite in the Talmud, and later authorities, with some viewing the nazirite as an ideal, and others viewing the nazirite as a sinner.

== Etymology ==
"Nazirite" comes from the Hebrew word nazir meaning "consecrated" or "separated", and may be ultimately derived from a root meaning "vow", similar to the Hebrew neder (נדר). The word nazir was also sometimes used to refer to a prince, who filled a special position of secular power, and the cognate word nezer can refer to either the state of being a nazirite, or else to a physical crown. In Modern Hebrew, the word nazir is largely used more generally to refer to any kind of monk or nun.

== Hebrew Bible ==
=== Laws ===
Besides the basic laws to be followed during the nazirite period, Numbers 6 describes in detail the sacrifices to be offered at the conclusion of the period.

The nazirite would make three offerings: a lamb as a burnt offering, a ewe as a sin offering, and a ram as a peace offering; also three additional offerings (a basket of unleavened bread, a grain offering, and a drink offering) to accompany the peace offering. He would also shave his head in the outer courtyard of the Temple in Jerusalem, and place the hair on the same fire as the peace offering. The text is unclear whether this refers to the fire on the altar, or a cooking fire.

If the nazirite has accidentally become impure by touching a corpse during the nazirite period, he must offer a different offering, and restart the nazirite period from the beginning.

=== Mentions ===
In addition to the nazirite laws, there are a few other mentions of nazirites in the Hebrew Bible.

The prophet Amos condemned the Israelites for their failure to respect the nazirite vow:

And I raised up some of your sons as prophets and some of your young men as nazirites... And you gave the nazirites to drink wine, and you commanded the prophets saying, "Do not prophesy."

The Rechabites were a group mentioned in the Bible who avoided wine, similar to nazirites.

The Septuagint uses a number of terms to translate the 16 uses of nazir in the Hebrew Bible, such as "he who vowed" (euxamenos εὐξαμένος) or "he who was made holy" (egiasmenos ἡγιασμένος) etc. It is left untranslated and transliterated in Judges 13:5 as nazir (ναζιρ).

=== Samson and Samuel ===
Two prominent Biblical individuals who were nazirites, or similar to nazirites, were Samson (Judges 13:5), and Samuel (1 Samuel 1:11). For both, their status was lifelong (unlike the nazirites described in Numbers 6). Both were born of previously barren mothers, and each entered into his vows through either his mother's oath (as in the case of Samuel), or a divine command to his mother (in the case of Samson), rather than by their own volition. These vows required Samson and Samuel to live devout lives, yet in return they received extraordinary gifts: Samson possessed strength and ability in physical battle against the Philistines, while Samuel became a prophet.

While Samson was explicitly commanded to be a nazirite (Judges 13:5), the word "nazirite" was not used regarding Samuel, rather he was "given to the Lord" and forbidden to cut his hair (1 Samuel 1:11).

Some commentators later noted that Samson appears to break his nazirite vow several times throughout the text; his killing of both humans and animals would frequently threaten, if not outright violate, his vow of ritual purity, and Judges 14:8–10 describes Samson holding a feast – an event which traditionally entailed the consumption of wine (though the text never states that Samson drank any wine himself). This conflict of interpretation has spawned numerous explanations: rabbinic sources claimed Samson had a unique nazirite status (called Nazir Shimshon) which permitted him to touch dead bodies, since the angel who imposed the status omitted this restriction. David Kimhi conjectures that even without this special status, Samson would be allowed to touch dead bodies while doing God's work defending Israel. Another argument analyzes the semantics of the vow itself; Numbers 6:6 forbids nazirites from coming near a nephesh-mot (a dead body), and though there are cases in the Pentateuch where nephesh is used to refer to animals (see Genesis 1:21, 24; 9:12; Lev. 11:46; etc.), the term in Numbers 6:6 is usually taken to imply the human dead, which seems to be its most focused meaning according to Numbers 6:7. In any event, the supernatural strength that Samson was given was evidently not taken away at the time of Judges 14, indicating that his nazirite vow was not considered broken. Goswell suggests that "we cannot understand the career and failings of Samson without attention to his Nazirite status."

== In Rabbinic literature ==
=== Laws ===
Halakha (Jewish law) has a rich tradition on the laws of the nazirite. In addition to the Biblical text of Numbers 6:1–21, the laws are explained in detail in the Mishna and Talmud, tractate Nazir. These laws were later codified by Maimonides in the Mishneh Torah.

==== Vows ====
An Israelite (not a gentile) becomes a Nazirite through an intentional verbal declaration. This declaration can be in any language, and can be something as simple as saying "I, too" as a Nazirite passes by. In general there are two types of Nazirites, those who take a vow for a set time, and permanent Nazirites. A person can specify how long he intends to be a Nazirite, but if no time period or a time period of less than 30 days is specified, the vow is considered to last for 30 days. A person who says "I am a Nazirite forever" or "I am a Nazirite for all my life" is a permanent Nazirite and slightly different laws apply. However, if a person says that he is a Nazirite for a thousand years, he is a regular Nazirite. The permanent Nazirite has no source in the Bible but is known through tradition.

All the laws of vows in general apply also to the nazirite vow. As with other vows, a father has the ability to annul the vow of his young daughter, and a husband has the ability to annul a vow by his wife, when he first hears about it (Numbers 30). A father, but not a mother, can declare his son, but not his daughter, a Nazirite, however the child or any close family member has a right to refuse this status. Likewise, all of the laws related to intent and conditional vows apply also to Nazirite vows.

==== Sacrifices ====
At the end of their vow, the Nazirite brings three sacrificial offerings to the Temple in Jerusalem. The first is a ewe for a chatat (sin offering), the second is a lamb for an olah (elevation offering), and finally a ram as a shelamim (peace offering) along with a basket of matzah and grain and drink offerings.

After bringing the sacrificial offerings, the Nazirite shaves their head in the outer courtyard of the Temple, and the hair is burned on "the fire which is under the peace offering". The rabbis (along with some but not all academic scholars) view this as simply the appropriate disposal of a sanctified object, rather than being the hair itself being a sacrifice.

Part of the Nazirite's offering is given to the Kohen; this gift is one of the twenty-four kohanic gifts.

A person can become a Nazirite whether or not the Temple in Jerusalem is standing. However, no temple means that there is currently no way to make the offerings that end the Nazirite vow, so anyone taking the vow would become a de facto permanent Nazirite.

==== Abstinence from grape products ====
A Nazirite must abstain from all beverages derived from grapes, even if they are not alcoholic. According to traditional rabbinic interpretation, the Nazirite may drink alcoholic beverages not derived from grapes. According to less traditional rabbinic interpretation, a Nazirite is forbidden to consume any alcohol, and vinegar from such alcohol, regardless of its source. The law regarding combining wine or grapes with other food is similar to kashrut, which applies to all Jews. An early rabbinic proverb warned the Nazirite: "Get yourself far around [it]! Don't even come near to a vineyard!"

==== Uncut hair ====
A Nazirite must refrain from cutting the hair of his head. He can groom his hair with his fingers or scratch his head and need not be concerned if some hair falls out, however, he cannot use a comb since it very likely to pull out some hair. A Nazirite is not allowed to use a chemical depilatory to remove hair. However, a Nazirite who recovers from the skin disease of tzaraath is obligated to cut his hair, and a permanent Nazirite may cut his hair once a year. Nazirites who shave their hair are obligated to redo the last 30 days of the Nazirite period.

==== Avoidance of corpses and graves ====
A Nazirite must avoid corpses and graves, even those of family members, and any building that contains one. (In this respect, the nazirite is similar to the high priest.) A permanent Nazirite becomes ritually impure through proximity to a corpse. Nonetheless, a Nazirite who finds an unburied corpse is obligated to bury it, although he will become defiled in the process.

If a Nazirite touches a corpse or carries a funeral bier, or goes into a building that contains a corpse, their vow is ended as unfulfilled. In this case, after he has waited seven days for his purification, the Nazirite should shave their head and to bring sacrificial offerings. After that, he is permitted to put himself under another Nazirite vow with a new time limit.

If the Nazirite simply enters an area where a grave or graveyard had been ploughed (in which case there is only a chance that he touched human bones), or if he went into a foreign land that was declared unclean by the chazal (sages) and had touched its earth, or if he stands beneath the branches of a tree or a rock that shades the ground (Hebrew: סככות) near a graveyard, he still contracts a level of uncleanness. However this is less than the impurity of touching corpse, and although he must be sprinkled with water containing the ashes of a red heifer on the third and seventh days, he is not required to shave his head or bring sacrificial offerings, and his Nazirite vow is not invalidated, though he adds seven days to the time he spends as a Nazirite to make up for the days of impurity.

=== Desirability ===
Noting that the nazirite must offer a sin-offering at the end of their vow (Numbers 6:13–14), Rabbi Eleazar ha-Kappar argued that nazirites are effectively sinners for unnecessarily distressing themselves, while Rabbi Elazar argued the opposite, that nazirites are "holy" (Numbers 6:5) and thus to become one is desirable.

Among medieval authorities, Maimonides followed the view of Rabbi Eliezer Hakappar, calling a nazirite a sinner, and explaining that a person should always be moderate in his actions and not be to any extreme. Nevertheless, he does point out that a nazirite can be evil or righteous depending on the circumstances. In contrast, Nachmanides sided with Rabbi Eleazer. He explains that ideally, the person should be a nazirite his whole life. Therefore, ceasing to be nazirite requires a sin offering. Opinions recorded in the Tosafot compromise between these views and explain that a nazirite is both good and bad.

Reviewing Halakhic and Aggadic literature, Jacob Neusner writes that Jewish sages generally viewed the vow of the nazirite to be shrouded in "arrogance" and "weakness".

According to Rabbi Meir, the tree of the knowledge of good and evil was a grape-vine, for "nothing brings wailing upon a person like wine".

=== Stories ===
According to the Mishnah, Queen Helena of Adiabene (c. 48 CE) once placed herself under a Nazirite vow for seven years, on condition that her son returned home from war safely. When her son returned home safely, she began to perform her Nazirite vow for seven years, after which she brought the required animal offerings to Jerusalem. Upon arriving there, she was told by the School of Hillel that she must observe her vow anew, and she therefore lived as a Nazirite for seven more years. Towards the end of those seven years, she contracted corpse uncleanness which rendered her vow as null and void, and, therefore, was required to repeat her Nazirite vow once again for a period of another seven years. Altogether, she continued her Nazirite vow for a period of 21 years.

According to the Jerusalem Talmud, Simeon the Just (a High Priest) opposed the nazirite vow and ate of the sacrifice offered by a nazirite on only a single occasion. Once a youth with flowing hair came to him and wished to have his head shorn. When asked his motive, the youth replied that he had seen his own face reflected in the spring and it had pleased him so that he feared lest his beauty might become an idol to him. He, therefore, wished to offer up his hair to God, and Simeon then partook of the sin offering which he brought.

The Jerusalem Talmud tells the story of 300 nazirites who came to offer sacrifices at the conclusion of their vow, but could not afford the animals for the sacrifices. Shimon ben Shetach, who was head of the Sanhedrin, was able to annul the vows of 150 of them (retroactively cancelling the nazirite period and making their sacrifices unnecessary), but was unable to find a justification to annul the vows of the other 150. He then went to the king (Alexander Jannaeus), and offered to split the costs of sacrifices for the 300 nazirites. The king provided money for the sacrifices of the 150; Shimon provided no money as the vows of his 150 were already nullified. This angered the king, who felt tricked: Shimon was forced to flee, but eventually reconciled with the king by explaining how they had contributed equally, "you with your money and I with my learning".

Gamaliel records in the Mishna show the father of Rabbi Chenena made a lifetime nazirite vow before him.

== In the New Testament ==
=== In the Gospels ===
The practice of a nazirite vow is part of the ambiguity of the Greek term "Nazarene" that appears in the New Testament; the sacrifice of a lamb and the offering of bread do suggest a relationship with Christian symbolism (then again, these are the two most frequent offerings prescribed in Leviticus, so no definitive conclusions can be drawn). While a saying in Matthew 11:18–19 and Luke 7:33–35 attributed to Jesus makes it doubtful that he, reported to be "winedrinker" (Greek οἰνοπότης, oinopotēs), was a nazirite during his ministry, the verse ends with the curious statement, "But wisdom is justified of all her children". The advocation of the ritual consumption of wine as part of the Passover in Mark 14:22–25 indicated he kept this aspect of the nazirite vow when Jesus said, "Verily I say unto you, I will drink no more of the fruit of the vine, until that day that I drink it new in the kingdom of God." The ritual with which Jesus commenced his ministry (recorded via Greek as "baptism") and his vow in Mark 14:25 and Luke 22:15–18 at the end of his ministry, do respectively reflect the final and initial steps (purification by immersion in water and abstaining from wine) inherent in a nazirite vow. These passages may indicate that Jesus intended to identify himself as a nazirite ("not drinking the fruit of vine") before his crucifixion.

Luke the Evangelist clearly was aware that wine was forbidden in this practice, for the angel (Luke 1:13–15) that announces the birth of John the Baptist foretells that "he shall be great in the sight of the Lord, and shall drink neither wine nor strong drink; and he shall be filled with the Holy Ghost, even from his mother's womb", in other words, a nazirite from birth, the implication being that John had taken a lifelong nazirite vow.

=== In the Acts of the Apostles ===
Acts of the Apostles is also attributed to Luke (see Luke-Acts) and in Acts 18:18 it is reported that the apostle Paul cut off his hair "because of a vow he had taken". From Acts 21:23–24 we learn that the early Jewish Christians occasionally took a vow of purification, and it is probable that the vow of St. Paul mentioned in Acts 18:18, was of a similar nature; the shaving of his head in Cenchrea, outside of Judea, was not in conformity with the rules laid down in the sixth chapter of Numbers, nor with the interpretation of them by the schools of that era. If we are to believe the legend of Hegesippus quoted by Eusebius, James, brother of Jesus, Bishop of Jerusalem, was a nazirite, and performed with rigorous exactness all the practices enjoined by that rule of life. In Acts 21:20–24 Paul was advised to counter the claims made by some Judaizers (that he encouraged a revolt against the Mosaic Law). He showed the "believers there" (believers in Jesus, i.e. the Jewish Christians) in Jerusalem otherwise by purifying himself and accompanying four men to the temple who had taken naziritic vows (so as to refute the naysayers).

This stratagem only delayed the inevitable mob assault on him. This event brought about the accusation in Acts 24:5–18 that Paul was the "ringleader of the sect of the Nazarenes". In any case, the relationship of Paul of Tarsus and Judaism is still disputed.

Luke does not here mention the apostle James the Just as taking nazirite vows, although later Christian historians (e.g. Epiphanius Panarion 29.4) believed he had, and the vow of a nazirite would explain the asceticism Eusebius of Caesarea ascribed to James, a claim that gave James the title "James the Just".

== In history ==
Besides the aforementioned mentions of nazirites in the Hebrew Bible, New Testament, and classic rabbinic texts, the following ancient texts describe cases of naziriteship:

=== Deuterocanonical texts ===
1 Maccabees, dated to about 166 BCE, mentions men who had ended their nazirite vows.

=== Josephus ===
Josephus mentions a number of people who had taken the vow, such as his tutor Banus. Josephus briefly recounts an episode where, in the 12th year of the reign of Nero, during the outbreak of the First Jewish-Roman War, Bernice (the sister of King Agrippa II) had put herself under a Nazirite vow and had come to Jerusalem thirty days before she was to offer her sacrifices. Josephus adds that those who put themselves under the Nazirite vow often did so when they "had been either afflicted with a distemper, or with any other distresses."

=== Early Syriac Christianity ===
Several Syriac Christians beginning in the 4th century appropriated the vow in ascetical practice.

Apharat writes in the 4th century: "The sons of Seth were virtuous in their virginity, but when they became mixed up with the daughters of Cain, they were blotted out with the water of the flood. Samson was honorable in his Naziriteship and in his virginity, but he corrupted his Naziriteship with his licentiousness."

John Scully records Ephrem suggesting that "the vines of Paradise rush out to meet only those ascetics who lead a life of virginity and abstain from wine" in the 4th century.

John the Solitary refers to John the Baptist for a model of fasting in the 5th century.

Dadisho's Commentary on Abba Isaiah lists several physical activities in relation to the term "Nazirite".

The anonymous author of the Cave of Treasures writes: And [the Priest] shall be a Nazirite all the days of his life. He shall not take a wife, he shall not have a house to dwell in, and he shall not offer the blood of animals or fowl. Rather, he will offer bread and wine to God.

== In modern religion ==
=== Modern Judaism ===
Rabbi David Cohen, a leading disciple of Rabbi Abraham Isaac Kook, was a nazirite for much of his life.

=== Rastafari ===
The tradition of the nazirite vow has had a significant influence on the Rastafari religion, and elements of the vow have been adopted as part of this religion. In describing the obligations of their religion, Rastafari make reference to the nazirite vow taken by Samson. Part of this vow, as adopted by the Rastafari, is to avoid the cutting of one's hair. This is inspired by the text of Leviticus 21:5 "They shall not make baldness upon their head, neither shall they shave off the corner of their beard nor make any cuttings in their flesh." The visible sign of this vow is the Rastafarian's dreadlocks. Some Rastafari have concluded that Samson had dreadlocks, as suggested by the description stating that he had seven locks upon his head (Judges 16:13).

Additionally, the Rastafari are taught to abstain from alcohol in accordance with the nazirite vow. They have also adopted dietary laws derived from Leviticus, which accounts for some similarity to the prohibitions of the Jewish dietary law of Kashrut.

=== Protestant perspectives ===
In 1979, Witness Lee of the Local Church movement published the Principle of the Nazarite, a short pamphlet outlining a metaphorical interpretation of the vow for uptake amongst Christians.

Lou Engle, a Charismatic evangelical American leader, has written Nazarite DNA, which outlines a metaphorical interpretation of the vow.

== See also ==
- Monasticism
- Naso (parsha)
- Temperance movement
- Tonsure
- Vrata
