= Altar of Burnt Offering =

Place of slaughter or sacrifice

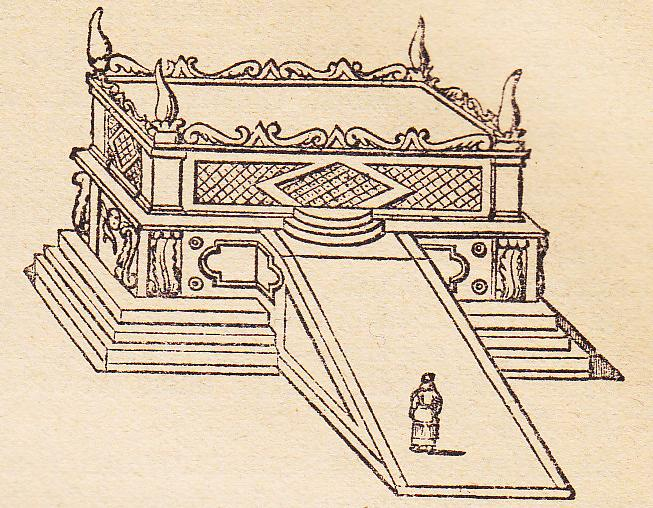
Illustration of the Altar of Burnt Offering

The Altar of Burnt Offering (mizbeach ha'olah; Exodus 30:28), also called the Brazen Altar (Exodus 39:39), the Outer Altar (mizbeach hachitzona), the Earthen Altar (mizbeach adamah), the Great Altar (mizbeach hagedola) and the Table of the Lord (Malachi 1:7) was the outdoor altar of the Tabernacle and Temples in Jerusalem. It stood in the Court of the Priests, between the Temple and the Court of Israel, and upon which the korbanot (animal and bird sacrifices) were offered. The blood of the sacrifices would be thrown against the base of the altar (Exodus 29:12; Leviticus 4:18), and portions of the sacrifices would be burned on top of it (precisely which portions would depend upon the type of sacrifice). Also consumed at the altar would be some of the meat offerings, and the drink offerings (libations of wine) were poured out here. All sacrifices had to be "seasoned with salt" (Leviticus 2:13, Numbers 18:19).

== Early Biblical altars ==
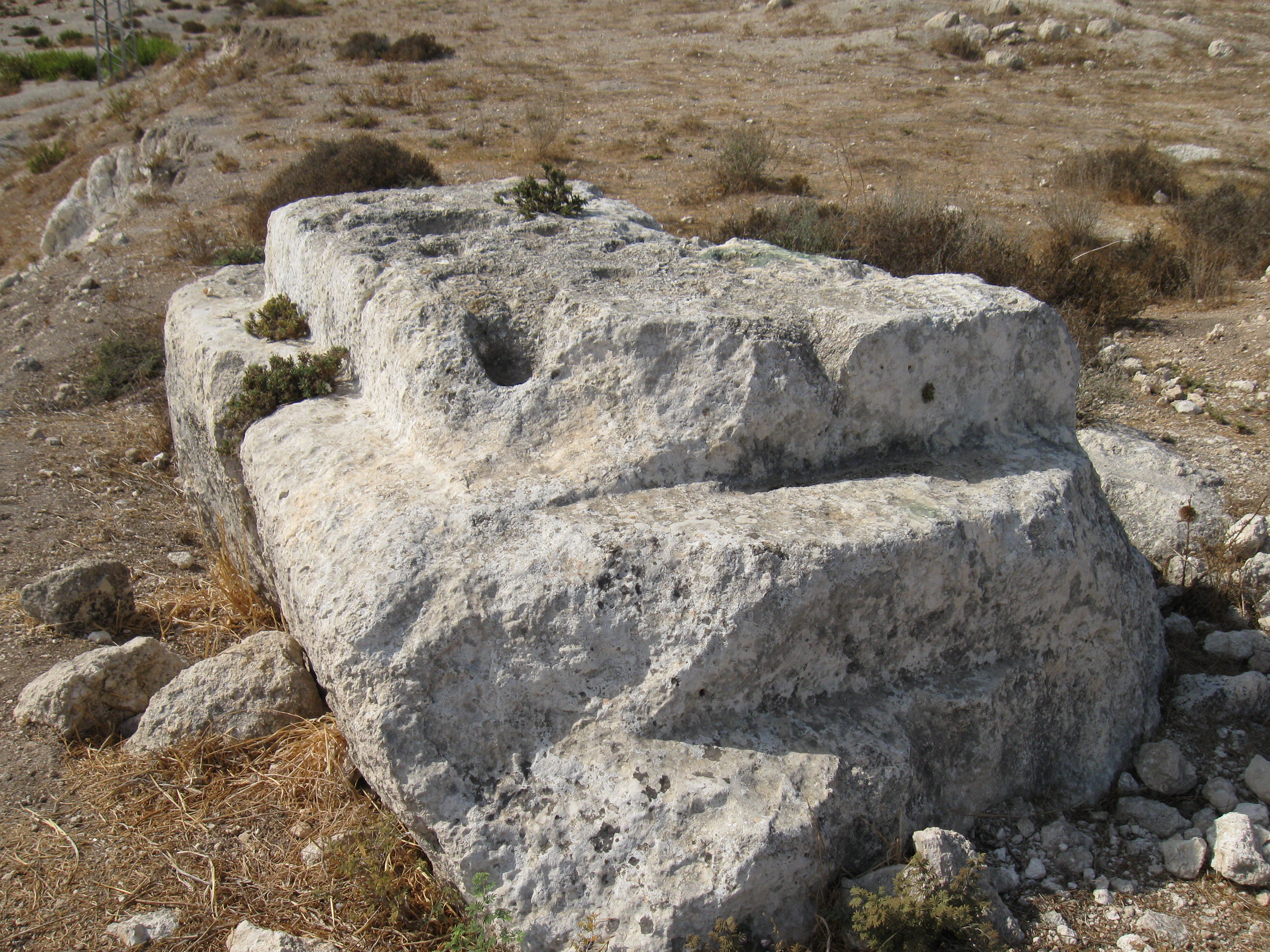
A rock-hewn altar discovered near Zorah, sometimes nicknamed "Manoah's Altar"

Altars (Biblical Hebrew: מִזְבֵּחַ, romanized: mizbēaḥ, lit. 'place of slaughter/sacrifice') in the Hebrew Bible were typically made of earth (Exodus 20:24) or unwrought stone (Exodus 20:25), but they could also be made of wood and even be portable. Altars were generally erected in conspicuous places (Genesis 22:9; Ezekiel 6:3; 2 Kings 23:12; 2 Kings 16:4; 2 Kings 23:8).

The first time the word mizbēaḥ appears in the Hebrew Bible is in Noah 's erection of one in Genesis 8:20. Other altars were erected by Abraham in Lech-Lecha and Vayeira (Genesis 12:7; Genesis 13:4; Genesis 13:18; Genesis 22:9); by Isaac in Toledot (Genesis 26:25), by Jacob in Vayishlach (Genesis 33:20; Genesis 35:1-3), by Moses in Exodus 17:15; and by Saul in 1 Samuel 14:35.

After the theophany on Mount Sinai, in the Tabernacle, and afterwards in the Temple in Jerusalem, only two altars are mentioned: the Altar of Burnt Offering and the Altar of Incense.

=== In archeology ===
The remains of three rock-hewn altars were discovered in the Land of Israel: one below Tel Zorah, another at the foot of Sebastia (ancient Samaria), and a third one near Shiloh.

== God's command ==
The Altar of Burnt Offering stood in the Court of the Priests, between the Temple and the Court of Israel, and upon which the korbanot (animal and bird sacrifices) were offered. The blood of the sacrifices would be thrown against the base of the altar (Exodus 29:12; Leviticus 4:18), and portions of the sacrifices would be burned on top of it (precisely which portions would depend upon the type of sacrifice). Also consumed at the altar would be some of the meat offerings, and the drink offerings (libations of wine) were poured out here. All sacrifices had to be "seasoned with salt" (Leviticus 2:13, Numbers 18:19).

A priest officiating at a burnt offering would vest in his priestly vestments before approaching the altar. He would remove the ashes and place them beside the altar. Then he would change his clothing and remove the ashes to a clean place outside the camp (Leviticus 6:10–11, Cf, 1:16).

In Exodus 27:3 the various utensils used with the altar are enumerated. They were made of brass. (Comp. 1 Samuel 2:13–14; Leviticus 16:12; Numbers 16:6–7). The altar could not be carved using utensils made of iron or of bronze (Exodus 20:25), nor were any allowed on or near it, because iron and bronze were used for implements of war. The Altar and its utensils were considered to be sacred, and the priests had to vest and wash their hands before touching them—even so much as removing the ashes from the altar.

According to the Bible, the fire on the altar was lit directly by the hand of God and was not permitted to go out (Leviticus 6:12–13). No strange fire could be placed upon the altar. The burnt offerings would remain on the altar throughout the night before they could be removed (Leviticus 6:9).

== In the Tabernacle ==
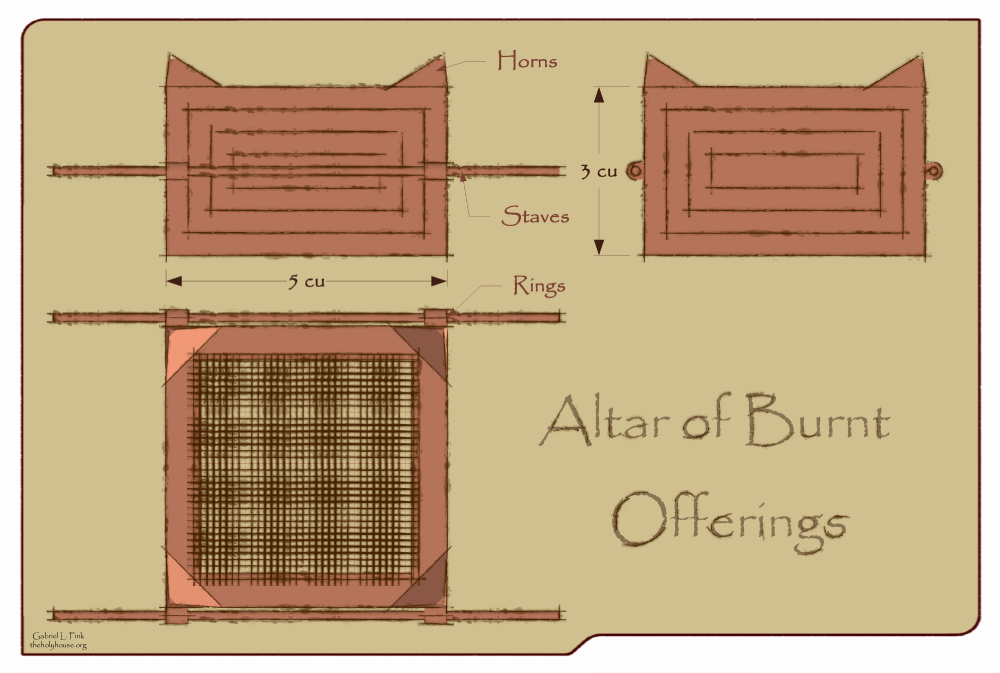
Model depiction of the Altar of Burnt Offerings in the Tabernacle.

The first altar of this type was made to be moved with the Children of Israel as they wandered through the wilderness. Its construction is described in Exodus 27:1–8. It was square, 5 cubits in length and in breadth, and 3 cubits in height. It was made of shittim wood, and was overlaid with brass. In each of its four corners projections, called "horns" (keranot), rose up. The altar was hollow, except for a mesh grate which was placed inside halfway down, on which the wood sat for the burning of the sacrifices. The area under the grate was filled with earth. There were rings set on two opposite sides of the altar, through which poles could be placed for carrying it. These poles were also made of shittim wood and covered with brass.

When Moses consecrated the Tabernacle in the wilderness, he sprinkled the Altar of Burnt Offering with the anointing oil seven times (Leviticus 8:10–11), and purified it by anointing its four horns with the blood of a bullock offered as a sin-offering, "and poured the blood at the bottom of the altar and sanctified it, to make reconciliation upon it" (8:14–15).

The Kohathites were the Levites who were responsible for moving and setting up the altar. When it was time for the Israelites to move, they removed the ashes from the altar, and spread a purple cloth over it, placed all of the instruments and vessels used in the sacrifices on it, covered it with a blanket of badger skin, and put the carrying poles in place (Numbers 4:13–14). After the rebellion of Korah, the bronze censers that were used by the rebels were converted by Eleazar into broad plates used to cover the altar, as a warning that only priests of the seed of Aaron may offer incense before the Lord (Numbers 16:36–40).

== In the First Temple ==
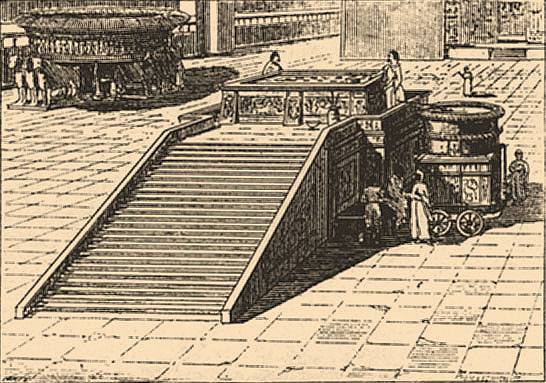
The altar (illustration from Brockhaus and Efron Jewish Encyclopedia (1906–1913))

The description of the altar in Solomon's Temple gives it larger dimensions (2 Chronicles 4:1. Comp. 1 Kings 8:22, 8:64; 9:25), and was made wholly of brass, covering a structure of stone or earth. Because this altar was larger than the one used in the wilderness, it had a ramp leading up to it. A ramp was used because the use of steps to approach the altar was forbidden by the Torah: "Do not climb up to My altar with steps, so that your nakedness not be revealed on it" (Exodus 20:26). On the day of the consecration of the new temple, Solomon also sanctified a space in the center of the Court of the Priests for burnt offerings, because the brasen altar he made was not large enough to hold all of the offerings (2 Chronicles 7:7).

This altar was said to be renewed by Asa (2 Chronicles 15:8) and removed by Ahaz (2 Kings 16:14), and "cleansed" by Hezekiah, in the latter part of whose reign it was rebuilt. It was finally broken up and carried away by the Babylonians in 586 BCE (Jeremiah 52:17).

== In the Second Temple ==
After their return from the Babylonian captivity according to the biblical narrative it was re-erected (Ezra 3:3–6) where it had formerly stood. When Antiochus IV Epiphanes pillaged Jerusalem, he defiled the Altar of Burnt Offering by erecting a pagan altar upon it. The First Book of Maccabees recounts how Judas Maccabeus renewed the altar when he re-took Jerusalem. Since the existing altar had been defiled by the blood of pagan sacrifices the old stones of the altar were removed and replaced with new, unhewn ones. However, since the old stones had been previously sanctified by the Jewish sacrifices they could not be moved to an unclean place; so they remained on the Temple Mount, "until there should come a prophet to tell what to do with them." (1 Maccabees 4:41–47).

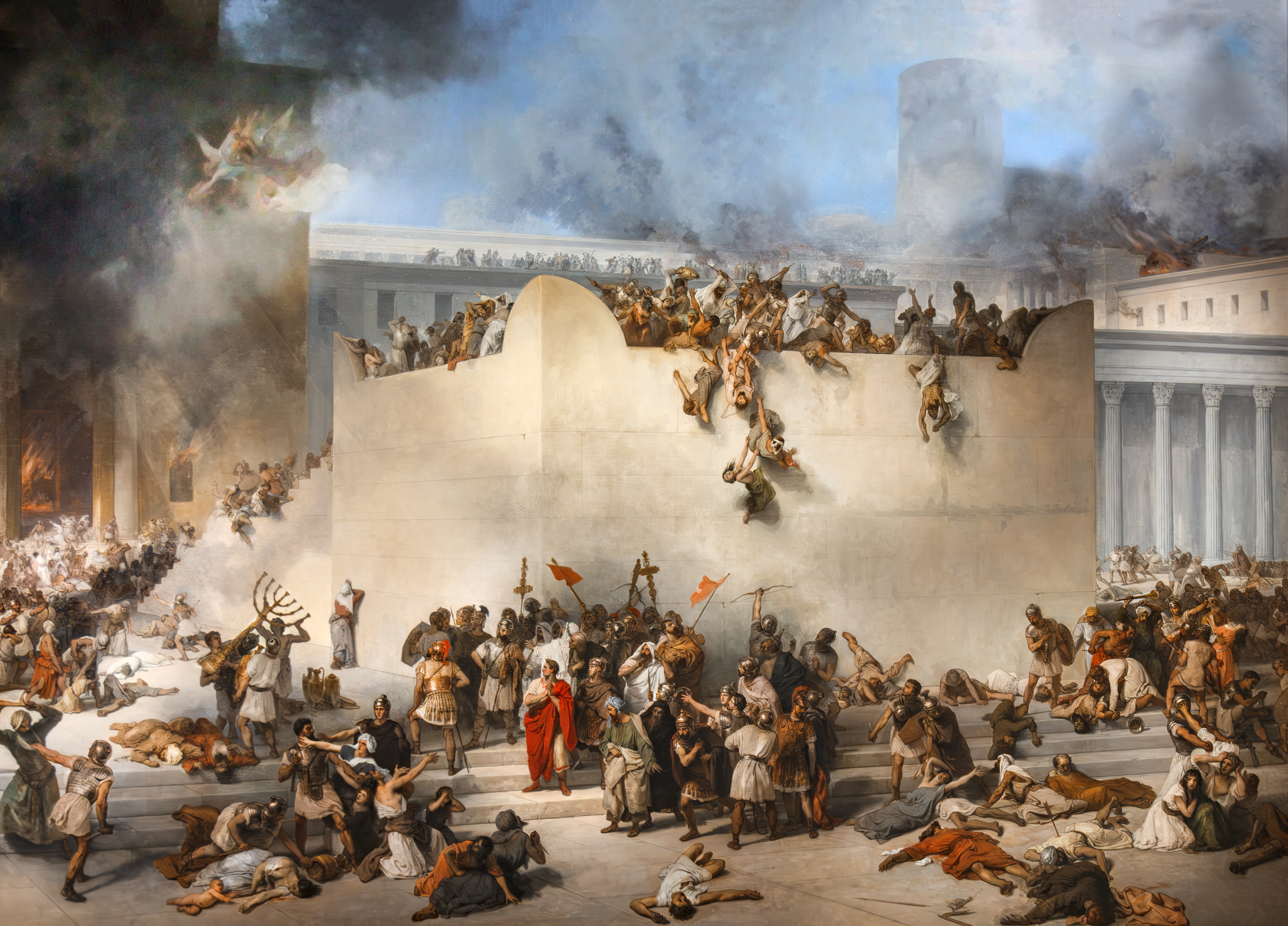
The Destruction of the Temple of Jerusalem, by Francesco Hayez. This imaginative depiction centers on the Altar of Burnt Offerings.

During Herod the Great's extensive building activity on the Temple Mount, it was likely refurbished. Talmudic scholars give a very precise description of the altar during the Second Temple period. The altar was built as a perfect square and was quite large: it reached a height of 10 cubits (app. 5 meters) and its width was 32 cubits (app. 16 meters). It was constructed of two main parts: the altar itself, and the ascent ramp. Both were constructed of stones and earth. On top of the altar at its four corners, there were hollow boxes which made small protrusions or "horns." These horns measured one cubit square and 5 handbreadths high, each (or, app. 18" x 18" x 15"). In this form, the altar remained in its place until the destruction of Jerusalem by the Romans in 70 CE.

In Jewish tradition, the upper part of the altar was made with a standard cubit of 6 handbreadths (טפחים), while the lower base of the altar, or tier, was made with a standard cubit of 5 handbreadths.
