= Sin offering =

Sacrificial offering

A sin offering (Hebrew: קָרְבַּן חַטָּאת, korban ḥatat, IPA: [χaˈtat], lit: "purification offering") is a sacrificial offering described and commanded in the Torah (Lev. 4.1-35); it could be fine flour or a proper animal. A sin offering also occurs in 2 Chronicles 29:21 where seven bulls, seven rams, seven lambs and seven he-goats were sacrificed on the command of King Hezekiah for the kingdom, for the sanctuary, and for Judah. Like all types of sacrifices offered on the altar, the flour had to be unscented and the animal had to be completely unblemished. This offered sacrifice accompanied the important required core means of atonement for the committing of an unintentional transgression of a prohibition, that either has brought guilt upon the 'community of Israel' or the individual. This offering is brought during or after atonement for those transgressions that had been committed inadvertently, or in ignorance: intentional transgressions could only be absolved by other forms of atonement, or in severe cases kareth. It was distinct from the biblical guilt offering.

== Etymology ==
The Hebrew noun ḥatat ("sin") comes from the verb ḥata (חָטָא) basically meaning "to miss the mark, to err". The first use is in the sentence "(..) Sin couches at the door; Its urge is toward you, Yet you can be its master" to Cain in Genesis 4:7. The noun ḥatat can mean "sin," or also by metonymy in phrases such as "the bullock ... it is sin," or "a bullock for a sin, for atonement": it can also stand for purification offering. The high priest was instructed to "...lay his hand upon the head of the purification offering [rosh ha-ḥatat רֹאשׁ הַֽחַטָּאת], and the purification offering shall be slaughtered at the place of the burnt offering" (Leviticus 4:29). To avoid confusion, the more explanatory term korban ḥatat ("a sacrifice of sin"; Hebrew: קרבן חטאת) is found in rabbinical commentaries.

== In the Jewish Bible ==
Chapters 4.1-5.13 of the Book of Leviticus presents the first of three speeches of God to Moses that outlines laws concerning the "ḥata't" or purification offering. Besides other types of offerings, it appears in the 24th (weekly) parsha Vayikra, a section of the Torah in the Masoretic Text of the Tanakh (Jewish Bible) A sin offering also occurs in 2 Chronicles 29:21 where seven bulls, seven rams, seven lambs and seven he-goats were sacrificed on the command of King Hezekiah for the kingdom, for the sanctuary, and for Judah.

The end of the 37th weekly Torah portion Shlach Lecha (Num. 15.22-31) again, deals with sacrifices for inadvertent violations: they are applicable for all laws, apply to both Israelites and alien residents, but exclude expiation of defiant, willful violations of ritual law (cf. Kareth).

== In the Greek Old Testament ==
In the Greek Old Testament, the Hebrew term for "sin" (ḥatat) is sometimes directly translated as "sin" - either by the Greek feminine noun hamartia ("sin" ἁμαρτία), or less commonly by the neuter noun hamartemata ("result of sin," "sinful thing" ἁμάρτημα) thereby duplicating the metonymy in the Hebrew text. More often the Greek paraphrases the Hebrew with expressions such as "that which is for sin" (peri hamartias περὶ ἁμαρτίας) or "for sins" (hyper hamartion ὑπὲρ ἁμαρτιῶν) - since the Greek noun hamartia does not have the double meaning of the noun ḥatat in Hebrew.

Chapter 4 of the Book of Leviticus in the Old Testament of Christian biblical canons provides Moses' instructions from God regarding the purification offering and chapter 15 of the Book of Numbers partially repeats them.

== Choice of sacrifice ==
The sacrificial animal required for a sin offering depended on the status of the sinner offering the sacrifice;

- for a high priest or for the entire community, a young bullock;
- for a king or nasi, a young male goat;
- for other individuals, a female kid or lamb;
- for poor individuals unable to afford these, two turtle doves or young pigeons could be substituted, one as a sin offering and the other as a burnt offering;
- for the very poorest individuals, a tenth of an ephah of unscented fine flour could be offered instead of an animal.

Like all types of sacrifices offered on the altar, the animal had to be completely unblemished.

Apart from such general offerings for an unintended sin, these offerings were made:

- on Yom Kippur, a bull as the high priest's offering, and a young male goat on behalf of the community;
- on the appointment of a priest, a calf as the priest's offering, and a small young goat on behalf of the community;
- on the termination of a Nazirite's vow, a yearling ewe as the Nazirite's offering;
- after recovery from tzaraat (skin disease), a ewe as the former sufferer's offering;
- shortly after childbirth, a dove as the woman's offering;
- after niddah (temporary marital separation due to menstruation) or recovery from zavah (abnormal bodily discharges), a dove or young pigeon.

== Ritual ==
The ritual of the purification offering began with the offerer confessing his/her unintentional transgression while placing his/her hands and pushing his/her full weight over the head of the animal. In the case of community offerings the elders performed this function, in the case of Yom Kippur, the high priest performed this task. The animal would then be slaughtered by a Shochet ("ritual butcher"), the blood carefully collected by the Kohen ("priest") in an earthen vessel and sprayed/thrown on the two outer corners of the Mizbeach ("altar"), while the fat, liver, kidneys, and caul, were burnt on the roof of the altar.

On Yom Kippur—the Day of Atonement—some of the blood would be sprinkled in front of the veil covering the entrance to the Holy of Holies when the blood would be sprinkled in front of the mercy seat; this was done seven times. The remainder of the blood was poured out at the base of the altar, and the earthen vessel that had contained it would be smashed.

The remaining flesh of the animal (in later rabbinical interpretation as one of the twenty-four kohanic gifts) was later consumed by the Kohen and his family, except when the priest himself was the offerer (such as in community offerings, and in the case of the Day of Atonement), when it would be burnt at a ritually clean location outside the Temple sanctuary. Leviticus 6:26 stipulates that "the priest who offers it for sin shall eat it. In a holy place it shall be eaten, in the court of the tabernacle of meeting", a point repeated at Leviticus 7:7, whereas Leviticus 6:29 allows that "all the males among the priests may eat it", suggesting that the proceeds of sin offerings could be shared within the kohanic community. The sharing of grain offerings within the kohanic community was more clearly endorsed by Leviticus 7:10 - "Every grain offering, whether mixed with oil or dry, shall belong to all the sons of Aaron, to one as much as the other".

When the sacrificial animal was a bird, the ritual was quite different. The bird was slaughtered by a thumb being pushed into its neck, and the head being wrung off. A second bird would then be burnt on the altar as a whole sacrifice, completely immolated by fire.

== Textual criticism ==
According to 19th century textual scholars, these rules originate from two different layers in the priestly source, thought by scholars to be one of the source texts of the Torah; the priestly code within the priestly source is believed to be a series of additions to the text, from Aaronid editors, over a long period. The earlier source is thought to be the one referring to the flesh being consumed by the priests, the latter part of Leviticus 6 falls into this source, while the later source, which Leviticus 4 falls within, reflects a development where the flesh from sin offerings was seen as insufficiently holy and thus needing to be disposed of elsewhere. In the Book of Hosea, a reference to the earlier form (Hosea 4:7-8) suggests a possible reason for the change - the priests were accused of rejoicing in the people's wickedness as they were living off the sin offerings. Although known as sin offerings, it is more likely that such offerings began as offerings made for unintentionally breaking a taboo (here meaning something which is seen as sacred but simultaneously prohibited).

1. The offerings for recovery from discharges and childbirth being for the breaking of a taboo about contact with blood - pus potentially containing blood, menstruation obviously containing it, and in the case of childbirth blood comes with the placenta. Textual scholars believe that the biblical regulation specifying the offering for childbirth in Leviticus 12 originally fell among those concerning bodily discharges in Leviticus 15 (due to various textual features), and hence that childbirth was treated as a form of abnormal discharge, for which a period of recovery was required.
2. The Nazarite's offering being due to the breaking of the Nazarite's own taboo nature, due to consecration to the deity, when the Nazarite vow was terminated.
3. Tzaraas was seen as a disease inflicted by God, as punishment for transgression of mitzvot, specifically slander and hence people becoming inflicted with Tzaraas themselves being seen as taboo (thus being temporarily expelled from society as a result); the sin offering for recovery from Tzaaras, for which the same sacrificial animal as the Nazarite's sin offering is proscribed, being due to the breaking of this taboo state by the act of recovering.
4. The Yom Kippur sin offering is considered to have developed slightly later; the biblical text seems to explain this offering as being for the purpose of protecting the high priest from death (...so that he does not die) when he approached the mercy seat, an action which was taboo (as the mercy seat was seen as sacred, but approach to it was prohibited). The passage in which this is explained as being about atonement for real sin, Leviticus 16:16 rather than just breach of this taboo, being considered by textual scholars to be a later gloss added to the text. The sin offering required when a priest had sinned, for which there is a similar sacrificial animal as the Yom Kippur offering, is considered by scholars to be a much later development, and only added to the text of Leviticus in the latest stages of its compilation, after sin offerings had begun to be seen as being about atonement for actual sin rather than relatively immediate breaches of taboos.

The other sin offerings are considered by scholars to be gradual developments; from being offered after contact with unclean animals, which is more of a taboo, to being offered for ritual uncleanliness in general, and finally to being offered for arbitrary sins. The gradations, according to which the type of sacrificial animal depends on the social status of the sinner, are considered by textual scholars to also be a later development.

== See also ==
- Votive offering
