= Korban =

Sacrificial offering in Judaism

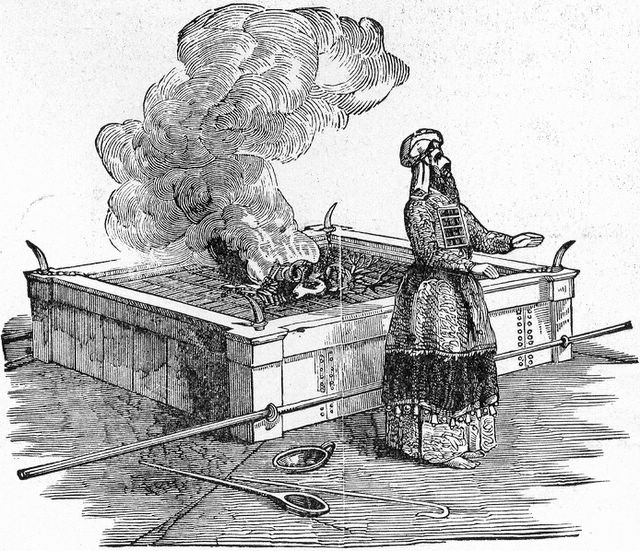
The High Priest offers the sacrifice of a goat performing korban

In Judaism, the korban (pronounced [/qɔrˈbɑːn/]; Biblical Hebrew: קָרְבָּן, romanized: qorbān; pl. קָרְבָּנוֹת, qorbānôt), also romanized as qorban or corban, (Note: The plural form can also be romanized as korbanot, korbanoth, or korbanos.) is any of a variety of sacrificial offerings described and commanded in the Torah.

The term korban primarily refers to sacrificial offerings given by humans to God to show homage, win favor, or secure pardon. The object sacrificed was usually an animal that was ritually slaughtered and then transferred from the human to the divine realm by being burned upon an altar. Other sacrifices included grain offerings, which were made from flour and oil instead of meat, and the incense offering.

After the destruction of the Second Temple, sacrifices were prohibited because there was no longer a temple in Jerusalem—the only location permitted by Halakha and biblical law for sacrificial offerings. The offering of sacrifices may have been briefly reinstated in Jerusalem during the Bar Kokhba Revolt, one of the Jewish–Roman wars of the second century CE, but the historical record is unclear.

When sacrifices were offered by the Israelites and, later, early Jews, they were offered as a fulfillment of the mitzvot ('commandments') enumerated in the Torah and Halakha. According to Orthodox Judaism, the coming of the prophesied Messiah will not vacate the requirement for Jews to keep the 613 commandments. When the Temple is rebuilt (as the Third Temple), sacrificial offerings may resume; Jewish religious movements disagree on whether this will be the case.

While some korbanot were offered as part of routine atonement for transgressions, their role was strictly limited. In Judaism, atonement can be achieved through means other than sacrificial offerings, including repentance, tzedakah ('charitable giving'), and tefillah ('prayer').

== Etymology ==
The Semitic root qrb (קרב) means 'be near' and is found in a number of related languages in addition to Hebrew, e.g. in the Akkadian language noun aqribtu, meaning 'act of offering'. In Hebrew it is found in a number of words, such as qarov, 'close', qerovim, 'relatives', and the hifʕil verb form hiqriv, 'he brought near; offered a sacrifice'. It is also related to the Arabic Islamic term qurban and to the Syriac Holy Qurbana.

The noun korban (plural korbanot, קָרְבֳּנוֹת) first occurs in the Bible in Leviticus 1:2 and occurs 80 times in the Masoretic Text: 40 times in Leviticus, 38 in Numbers and twice in Ezekiel. The related form qurban appears only in Nehemiah 10:35 and 13:31 referring to the 'wood offering'. The etymology of the 'offer' sense is traditionally understood as deriving from the verbal sense of 'bringing near', viz. bringing the offering near to the deity, but some theological explanations see it rather as bringing "man back to God".

The Septuagint generally translates the term in Koine Greek as δῶρον, 'gift', θυσία, 'sacrifice', or προσφορά, 'offering up'. By the Second Temple period, Hellenistic Jewish texts use korban specifically to mean a vow. The New Testament preserves korban once as a transliterated loan-word for a vow, once also a related noun, κορβανάς ('temple treasury'), otherwise using δῶρον, θυσία or προσφορά and other terms drawn from the Septuagint. Josephus also generally uses other words for 'offering' but uses korban for the vow of the Nazirites (Antiquities of the Jews 4:73 / 4,4,4) and cites Theophrastus as having cited a korban vow among the Tyrians (Against Apion 1.167 / 1,22,4).

== Purpose ==
The idea conveyed in most korbanot was that of a "gift" to God.

Korbanot served a variety of purposes. Many were brought purely for the purpose of communing with God and becoming closer to God, or in order to express thanks, gratitude, and love to God.

While some korbanot were offered as part of the atonement process for sin, this role was strictly limited. Standard sin-offerings could only be offered for unintentional sins; according to the rabbis, they could not be offered for all sins, but only for unintentional violations of some of the most serious sins. In addition, korbanot generally had no expiating effect without sincere repentance and restitution to any person who was harmed by the violation. In the absence of sacrifices, atonement can still be achieved through means such as repentance, prayer, or giving tzedakah.

The slaughter of an animal sacrifice is not considered a fundamental part of the sacrifice, but rather is an unavoidable preparatory step to the offering of its meat to God; thus, the slaughter may be performed by any Jew, while the other stages of the sacrifice could only be performed by priests.

== Hebrew Bible ==
=== Laws and stories ===
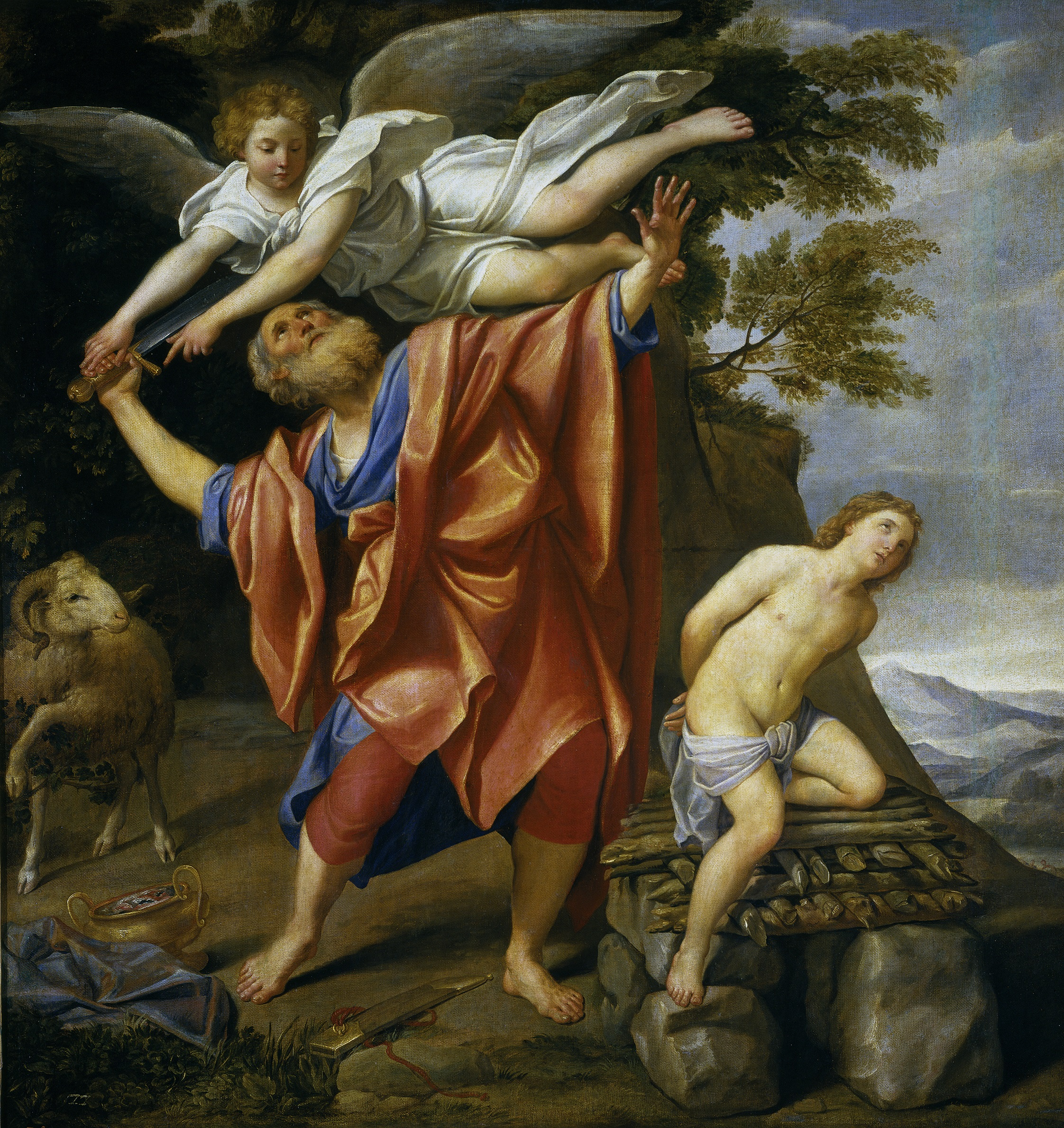
God commands Abraham to offer his son Isaac as a sacrifice, Domenichino.

Offerings are mentioned in the Book of Genesis and further detailed in the remaining four books of the Torah, which elaborate on their origins and history. Cain and Abel, Noah, Abraham, and Jacob offered sacrifices, as did the Israelites at Mount Sinai.

The Torah contains many laws about sacrifices. Different sacrifices are commanded for regular weekdays and Shabbat, and numerous Jewish holidays also feature their own specific offerings. Sacrificial procedures were described in detail. Sacrifices were only to be offered by the Kohanim (כֹּהֲנִים), whom the Hebrew Bible describes as male descendants of Aaron who meet certain marital and ritual purity requirements.

The locations at which sacrificial offerings were made changed throughout Jewish history. Before building the Temple in Jerusalem, when the Israelites were in the desert, sacrifices were only to be offered in the Tabernacle. After the invasion of Canaan, sacrifices were also permitted at bamot in any location until the nation's enemies had been defeated and the people lived securely, after which sacrifices were supposed to be centralized again. However, in practice, the bamot were still used even during the secure monarchic period, and the Hebrew Bible's authors sometimes criticize Israelite kings for allowing this. Sacrificial offerings outside the Temple complex are recorded as having occurred at Beit Shemesh, Mizpah, Ramah, Gilgal, and Bethlehem, among other locations.

After the entry to Canaan, the main sacrificial centre was initially at Shiloh. Under Saul, the main center of sacrifice was Nob, though private offerings continued to be made at Shiloh. David created a new sacrificial center in Jerusalem at the threshing floor of Araunah (also known as Ornan), adjacent to Jerusalem, to which he moved the Ark. According to the Hebrew Bible, after the building of Solomon's Temple, sacrifices were only to be carried out there. After Solomon's Temple was destroyed, sacrifices were resumed when the Second Temple was built, until the Second Temple was also destroyed in 70 CE.

=== Attitudes ===
Many of the Biblical prophets criticized those Israelites who brought sacrifices while continuing to violate God's will with immoral behavior. This criticism often took the form of scathing denunciations:

What need have I for all your sacrifices? says the Lord.

Your burnt-offerings are not desirable to Me, nor are your sacrifices pleasing to Me.

How shall I come before the Lord, and bow before the exalted God? Shall I approach him with burnt-offerings, with yearling calves? Will the Lord be pleased with thousands of rams, with myriads of rivers of oil?... You, man, have been told what is good, and what the Lord requires of you: only to do justice, to love kindness, and to walk modestly with your God.

However, while rejecting the value of sacrifices accompanied by unjust behavior, the same prophets promised an eventual reconciliation between God and a more moral people of Israel, and proclaimed that the reestablishment of sacrifices would be a sign of this reconciliation. Thus sacrifices have a place in their visions of eventual redemption:

I will bring them to My holy mountain; I will gladden them in My house of prayer. Their burnt-offerings and sacrifices will find favor on My altar, for My house will be a house of prayer for all the nations.

Again will be heard in this place... the voice of those who say "Give thanks to the Lord of Hosts, for the Lord is Good, for His kindness is forever", and of those who bring thanksgiving sacrifices to the house of the Lord.

=== List of sacrifices ===
This is an incomplete list of sacrifices mentioned in the Hebrew Bible.

Types of sacrifice include:

- Burnt offering (olah), entirely burnt on the altar
- Peace offering (shelamim), mostly eaten by humans
- Sin offering (hatat)
- Guilt offering (asham)
- Gift offering (minkhah), consisting of vegetable rather than animal products

Sacrifices offered on specific occasions include:

- Daily offerings (tamid)
- Mussaf (additional) offering for Shabbat and holidays
- The Passover sacrifice
- First Fruits on the holiday of Shavuot.
- Temple tax – The half-shekel tax for Temple needs.

Sacrifices connected to one's personal status or situation include:

- Offering following childbirth (Leviticus 12; see Kinnim)
- The offering for an accused adulterous wife (Ordeal of the bitter water)
- Thank offering (todah)
- Offerings relevant to fulfillment of, or transgression of, the Nazirite vow.
- Offerings following cure from certain diseases and unusual bodily discharges.

Other sacrifices include:

- Dough offering (khallah)
- Voluntary offerings

Procedures connected to sacrifices include:

- Semikha (laying on hands) of sacrificial animals

== Rabbinical interpretation ==
=== 100 among the 613 commandments ===
According to Maimonides, in Sefer Hamitzvot, about one hundred of the permanent 613 commandments based on the Torah, by rabbinical enumeration, directly concern sacrifices, excluding those commandments that concern the actual Temple and the priests themselves, of which there are about another fifty.

=== Instructions in Mishnah and Talmud ===
The Mishnah and Talmud devote a very large section, known as a seder, to the study and analysis of Kodashim, whereby all the detailed varieties of korbanot are enumerated and analyzed in great logical depth, such as qodshim kalim ('of minor degree of sanctity') and qodashei qodashim ('of major degree of sanctity'). Tractate Pesachim is largely devoted to discussing how to offer the Passover sacrifice. Tractate Yoma contains a detailed discussion of the Yom Kippur sacrifices, and there are sections in Seder Moed ('Order of Appointed Times') for the special offerings and Temple ritual for other major Jewish holidays. Tractate Shekalim discusses the annual half-shekel offering for Temple maintenance and governance, and tractate Nashim discusses the offerings made by Nazirites and suspected adulterers.

The Talmud provides extensive details not only on how to perform sacrifices but also on how to adjudicate difficult cases, such as what to do if a mistake is made and whether improperly performing one of the required ritual elements invalidates it. The Talmud explains how to roast the Passover offering, how to dash blood from different kinds of sacrifices upon the altar, how to prepare the incense, the regulatory code for the system of taxation that financed the priesthood and public sacrifices, and numerous other details.

=== Rationale and rabbinic commentary ===
Maimonides, a medieval rabbi and Jewish scholar, drew on early critiques of the need for sacrifice, holding that God always regarded sacrifice as inferior to prayer and philosophical meditation. However, God understood that the Israelites were used to the animal sacrifices that the surrounding pagan tribes used as the primary way to commune with their gods. As such, in Maimonides' view, it was only natural that Israelites would believe that sacrifice would be necessary in the relationship between God and man. This view is controversial since the Torah also forbids worship of foreign idols and practices of pagan religions as "detestable" before God, including their sacrifices. Maimonides concludes that God's decision to allow sacrifices was a concession to human psychological limitations. It would have been too much to have expected the Israelites to leap from pagan worship to prayer and meditation in one step. In The Guide for the Perplexed, he writes:

But the custom which was in those days general among men, and the general mode of worship in which the Israelites were brought up consisted in sacrificing animals... It was in accordance with the wisdom and plan of God...that God did not command us to give up and to discontinue all these manners of service. For to obey such a commandment would have been contrary to the nature of man, who generally cleaves to that to which he is used; it would in those days have made the same impression as a prophet would make at present [the 12th century] if he called us to the service of God and told us in His name, that we should not pray to God nor fast, nor seek His help in time of trouble; that we should serve Him in thought, and not by any action.

In contrast, many others, such as Nahmanides (in his commentary on Leviticus 1:9), disagreed. Nahmanides cites the fact that the Torah records the practices of animal and other sacrifices from the times of Abraham, Isaac, and Jacob and earlier. Indeed, the purpose of recounting the binding of Isaac was to illustrate the sublime significance and need of animal sacrifices as supplanting the abomination of human sacrifices.

Through a non-all-encompassing view of the ritual life of "Abraham [sic] as it is presented in the book of Genesis, the evolving philosophical theology that seems to underlie the modes of worship that [he] develops over time [...] is reconstruct[ed.]" Abram's building of a number of altars without mentioning that he sacrificed animals on them, and that for most of these occasions, he "called out in the name of God" is interpreted by Samuel Lebens as theologically stating that God's desires are sated without animal sacrifices. Noting that not all these altar building occasions were accompanied by call-outs, and that call-outs also took place on returns, in Everlasting Dominion, American Christian Old Testament scholar Eugene H. Merrill attributes a multipurpose nature to the altars, in which Abram was participating in only one:

Later, Abram, having entered Canaan, "built" an altar to the Lord at Shechem (Gen. 12:7). The narrative fails to speak of his making a sacrifice there; in fact, the inspiration for building the altar is that the Lord "appeared to [him]." This may suggest that mīzbēaḥ refers not so much to an altar of sacrifice as to some kind of stele or monument marking God's presence there. As we shall see, this was not an uncommon thing even among the Israelites (e.g., Judg. 6:24; Josh. 22.21-34; 2 Kings 16:15b). Future generations of Abram's offspring would see the altar at Shechem and remember the promises the Lord had made to their ancestors and to them. The same was true at Bethel (v. 8), and though there is no reference to the appearance of the Lord at that place, there is likewise no record of a sacrifice being made there. Abram himself returned to Bethel; and seeing the altar still there, he "called on the name of the Lord" (Gen 13:4 NIV). The altar clearly served the purpose of a sacred memorial.

Nonetheless, Abram also entered into the covenant of the pieces, which was based on a divine set of promises accompanied by obligations and an animal sacrifice ritual, to the extent that it physically symbolized irrevocability. Likewise, in Hebrew, the verb meaning "to seal a covenant" translates literally as "to cut." Furthermore, to measure the general importance given to animal sacrifice preceding Abram in Genesis, in the story of Cain and Abel the only differentiator mentioned leading God to "[have] not respect [...] unto Cain and to his offering" was Abel's "firstlings of his flock and of the fat thereof" as opposed to Cain's "fruit of the ground[.]" Then, starkly contrasting a diminutive effect resulting from Abram's altar building and call-outs, animal sacrifice was institutionalized in the era of Moses in Numbers 28:1–30:1. The schedule of obligatory sacrifices included two daily lamb burnt-offerings. However, the physical participation of God in the consumption of sacrificial offerings is debatable. The seeming all-time peak occurred with his conclusive victory as Yahweh when Elijah challenged worshippers of the Canaanite deity Baal to pray for fire to light their respective bull animal sacrifices.

=== As a metaphor ===
Metaphorically, a person's efforts to purify their soul are described as "sacrific[ing one's] animalistic nature" to allow them to become close to God (in keeping with the root of the word korban, meaning "to draw close"). Devotion to God can be described as "sacrificing one's soul to God", as in the poem Bilvavi mishkan evneh by Yitzchak Hutner.

== The end of sacrifices ==
With the destruction of the Second Temple in Jerusalem by the Romans, the Jewish practice of offering korbanot stopped for all intents and purposes. Despite subsequent intermittent periods of small Jewish groups offering the traditional sacrifices on the Temple Mount, the practice effectively ended.

Rabbinic Judaism was forced to undergo a significant development in response to this change; no longer could Judaism revolve around the Temple services. The destruction of the Temple led to a development of Jewish observance in the direction of text study, prayer, and other practices, which were seen to varying extents as substitutes for the Temple service. A range of responses is recorded in classical rabbinic literature on this subject:

Once, Rabbi Yohanan ben Zakkai was walking with his disciple, Rabbi Yehoshua, near Jerusalem after the destruction of the Temple. Rabbi Yehoshua looked at the Temple ruins and said "Alas for us! The place that atoned for the sins of the people Israel lies in ruins!" Then Rabbi Yohanan ben Zakkai spoke to him these words of comfort: 'Be not grieved, my son. There is another equally meritorious way of gaining ritual atonement, even though the Temple is destroyed. We can still gain ritual atonement through deeds of loving-kindness. For it is written "Loving kindness I desire, not sacrifice." (Hosea 6:6)

In the Babylonian Talmud, a number of sages opined that following Jewish law, doing charitable deeds, and studying Jewish texts is greater than performing animal sacrifices:

Rabbi Elazar said: Doing righteous deeds of charity is greater than offering all of the sacrifices, as it is written: "Doing charity and justice is more desirable to the Lord than sacrifice" (Proverbs 21:3).

Nonetheless, numerous texts of the Talmud stress the importance of and hope for eventual re-introduction of sacrifices, and regard their loss as a tragedy. Partaking of sacrificial offerings was compared to eating directly at one's Father's table, whose loss synagogue worship does not entirely replace. One example is in Berachot:

...at the time that the people of Israel enter the synagogues and houses of study, and respond (in the Kaddish) "May His great name be blessed", the Holy One, Blessed is He, shakes His head and says: "Fortunate for the king who is praised this way in his house. What is there for the Father who has exiled His children. And woe to the children who have been exiled from their Father's table."

Another example is in Sheqalim:

Rabbi Akiva said: Shimon Ben Loga related the following to me: I was once collecting grasses, and I saw a child from the House of Avitnas (the incense-makers). And I saw that he cried, and I saw that he laughed. I said to him, "My son, why did you cry?" He said, Because of the glory of my Father's house that has decreased." I asked "And why did you laugh?" He said to me "Because of the glory prepared for the righteous in the future." I asked "And what did you see?" [that brought on these emotions]. "The herb maaleh ashan [used in Temple incense] is growing next to me."

=== In non-Orthodox Judaism ===
Non-Orthodox branches of Judaism (Conservative, Reform, and Reconstructionist) regard the korbanot as an ancient ritual that will not return.

Conservative Judaism disavows the resumption of korbanot. Consistent with this view, it has deleted prayers for the resumption of sacrifices from the Conservative siddur, including the morning study section from the sacrifices and prayers for the restoration of qorbanot in the Amidah, and various mentions elsewhere. Consistent with its view that priesthood and sacrificial system will not be restored, Conservative Judaism has also lifted certain restrictions on kohanim, including limitations on marriage prohibiting marrying a divorced woman or a convert. Conservative Judaism does, however, believe in the restoration of a Temple in some form, and in the continuation of kohanim and Levites under relaxed requirements, and has retained references to both in its prayer books. Consistent with its stress on the continuity of tradition, many Conservative synagogues have also retained references to Shabbat and Festival korbanot, changing all references to sacrifices into the past tense (e.g. the Orthodox "and there we will sacrifice" is changed to "and there they sacrificed"). Some more liberal Conservative synagogues, however, have removed all references to sacrifices, past or present, from the prayer service. Siddur Sim Shalom, a common siddur in Conservative synagogues in North America, provides both service alternatives.

Reform Judaism and Reconstructionist Judaism disavow all belief in a restoration of a Temple, the resumption of korbanot, or the continuation of identified Cohens or Levites. These branches of Judaism believe that all such practices represent ancient practices inconsistent with the requirements of modernity, and have removed all or virtually all references to korbanot from their prayer books.

== In prayer ==
The traditional siddur, as developed over the past two millennia, contains many references to Temple sacrifices, prayers for their resumption, and rituals intended to remind worshipers of the Temple service. Numerous details of an ordinary Jew's daily religious practice are connected to remembering the rhythm of the Temple's life and its sacrifices.

=== Contemporary Orthodox Judaism ===
Today, Orthodox Judaism includes mention of each korban on either a daily basis in the siddur (daily prayer book) or the machzor (holiday prayerbook) as part of the prayers for the relevant days concerned. They are also referred to in the prayerbooks of Conservative Judaism in an abbreviated fashion.

References to sacrifices in the Orthodox prayer service include:

- The standard prayer services (shacharit, mincha, maariv, and mussaf) were instituted to correspond to sacrifices once offered at the same times.
- The mussaf prayer (recited on Shabbat and Jewish holidays) requests the reinstatement of the special sacrifices for those days.
- Korbanot (see section below): a section of the morning prayer service devoted to readings related to the sacrifices.
- Retzai: Every Orthodox Amidah, the central prayer of Jewish services, contains the paragraph: "Be favorable, Oh Lord our God, to your people Israel and their prayer, and restore the service of the Holy of Holies of Your House, and accept the fire-offerings of Israel and their prayer with love and favor, and may the service of your people Israel always be favored." Conservative Judaism removes the fire-offerings clause from this prayer.
- Yehi Ratzon: Private recitation of the Amidah traditionally ends with the Yehi Ratzon prayer for the restoration of the Temple.
- The Amidah itself is said to represent the purpose of the daily korban liturgically, while the recitation of the korbanot sections fulfill the formal responsibility to perform them in the absence of the Temple.
- After the weekday Torah reading, a prayer is recited for the rebuilding of the Temple in Jerusalem: "May it be the will before our Father who is in heaven to establish the House of our lives and to return his Shekhinah into our midst, speedily, in our days, and let us say Amen."
- The Torah reading for each Jewish holiday includes the passage describing that holiday's mussaf sacrifice.
- The traditional texts for Selichot and each Yom Kippur prayer include a request that God fulfill the promise made by God to the Jews in Isaiah 56:7: that sacrifices will resume in the Temple in the future and be accepted by God.

=== The korbanot section of prayer ===
A section of the morning daily Shacharit prayer is called Korbanot and is mainly devoted to recitation of legal passages relating to the sacrifices. According to the Talmud, this recitation takes the place of the sacrificial offering and achieves the same atonement that sacrifices would have achieved if they were possible.

In Nusach Ashkenaz, this section includes the following:

- Korban Tamid: the biblical commandment to offer a daily morning and evening sacrifice. On Shabbat and Rosh Chodesh, the Tanakh sections regarding the mussaf offerings for those days are recited after Korban Tamid.
- Eizehu mekoman: a concise overview of all the sacrifices and many of their laws (Mishnah Zevachim 5). Some suggest that it was included in the siddur at the given point in shacharit because it discusses all the sacrifices; the Rabbis did not dispute within it.
- Rabbi Yishmael omer: Rabbi Ishmael's 13 rules of Tanakh interpretation and subsequent Halakhic application, which are also the introduction to the Sifra. The passage Rabbi Yishmael omer does not discuss sacrifices, and recitations of both it and Eizehu mekoman were instituted so that a person would study a selection of each of the three divisions of Torah—Mikra, Mishnah, and Gemara—each day not because of any connection to sacrifices. However, these passages are still commonly considered part of the Korbanot section of prayer.
- The Torah study session completed individually (i.e., before Pesukei dezimra) concludes with a short prayer (Yehi Ratzon): "May the Temple be rebuilt speedily in our days, and may the offering of Judah and Jerusalem be pleasing to God, as in days of old and in former years."

In a later period, some communities began to add the following (all or some of the paragraphs):

- Kiyor – Describing the basin containing pure water to wash up before touching the korbanot (offerings), based on Exodus 30:17–21
- Trumat Hadeshen – Removing the ashes of the korban olah (elevation offering), based on Leviticus 6:1–6
- Ketoret (Incense offering): Based on Exodus 30:34 and Exodus 36:7–8 as well as a rabbinic text derived from Talmud (Kritut 6a; Jerusalem Talmud Yoma 4:5, 33a).

== Resumption of sacrifices ==
=== Attitudes ===
The prevailing belief among rabbinic Jews is that in the Messianic Age, the Messiah will come, and a Third Temple will be built. The standard (Note: There is no singular "standard" Amidah text, but most if not all traditional Amidah texts contain the here-mentioned section on rebuilding the temple. Exceptions are mostly found in Reform nusaħot.) Amidah prayer-text, recited daily by Jews worldwide for the last 1800 years, asks God to "return the service to the Holy of Holies of your Temple, and the fire-offerings of Israel and their prayers may you accept with favor". It is believed that the korbanot will be reinstituted, but to what extent and for how long is unknown.

According to some classical rabbinic sources hold that most or all sacrifices will not be offered: "In the future, all sacrifices, with the exception of the Thanksgiving-sacrifice, will be discontinued."

Maimonides and Rabbi Abraham Isaac Kook, despite some claims, believed that sacrifices would be resumed in the messianic era. However, Kook believed that sacrifices could only be resumed once there was "an open appearance of the holy spirit in Israel". Rabbi Hayim David HaLevi suggested that the future sacrificial service might be limited to grain-offerings, with no animal sacrifices being performed. He based this assertion, which he called "highly novel", on Malachi 3:4 which speaks only of future mincha offerings, as well as the assumption that the word mincha refers to grain-offerings, as it usually does. However, according to other interpretations, mincha can also refer to animal sacrifices.

According to a minority opinion in the Talmud, in the future, the Torah's commandments will be nullified. Interpretations of this statement differ as to which commandments will be abolished, for whom, and at what stage (for example, Rashba ruled that commandments are nullified for a person after they have died but never for the living). Some kabbalistic sources envision a messianic era when the natural order will drastically change, and animals will be on a human level, at which point no animal sacrifices will be offered.

Orthodox Judaism holds that in the messianic era, most or all of the korbanot will be reinstituted, at least for a time.

Conservative Judaism and Reform Judaism hold that no animal sacrifices will be offered in a rebuilt Temple at all.

=== Halakhic issues ===
In the 1800s, a number of Orthodox rabbis studied the idea of reinstating korbanot on the Temple Mount, even though the messianic era had not yet arrived and the Temple was not rebuilt. A number of responsa concluded that, within certain parameters, it is permissible according to Jewish law to offer such sacrifices. The debate on this topic involves numerous complex halakhic questions, among them:

- Whether Jews are commanded nowadays to build a Temple
- Whether sacrifices may be offered in the absence of a Temple
- Whether the proper locations of the Temple building and altar can be identified
- Whether the surviving halachic texts provide enough detail to construct the Temple and its vessels properly
- Whether the current state of ritual impurity prevents offering sacrifices
- Whether the proper representation of the Jewish people can be organized for communal sacrifices
- Whether priests and Levites whose status can be properly verified can be identified.

During the early 20th century, Israel Meir Kagan advised some followers to set up special yeshivas for married students known as Qodshim Kolelim that would specialize in the study of the korbanot and study with greater intensity the qodshim sections of the Talmud in order to prepare for the arrival of the Jewish Messiah who would oversee the rebuilding of the original Temple of Solomon in Jerusalem that would be known as the Third Temple. His advice was taken seriously and today there are a number of well-established Haredi institutions in Israel that focus solely on the subject of the korbanot, qodshim, and the needs of the future Jewish Temple, such as the Brisk tradition and Soloveitchik dynasty.

=== Efforts to resume sacrifices ===
A few groups, notably the Temple Institute and the Temple Mount Faithful, have petitioned the Israeli government to rebuild a Third Temple on the Temple Mount and restore sacrificial worship. The Israeli government has not responded favorably. Most Orthodox Jews regard rebuilding a Temple as an activity for a Jewish Messiah as part of a future Jewish eschatology, and most non-Orthodox Jews do not believe in the restoration of sacrificial worship at all. The Temple Institute has been constructing ritual objects in preparation for a resumption of sacrifices. According to The Times of Israel, "[w]hile the temples have not existed and Jews have not performed such sacrifices for nearly 2,000 years, small groups ascend the mount perennially to try to revive the ritual, without success." Israeli police have routinely detained groups attempting to smuggle goats onto the Temple Mount for sacrifice.

== References in non-rabbinic sources ==
=== New Testament ===
In the Christian New Testament, Jesus is reported in Mark 7:11 as criticising the practice of dedicating possessions as Korban.

=== Josephus ===
The Jewish historian Josephus uses the term Korban in the second book of his historiography titled The War of the Jews, written in the first century CE. Josephus records, in chapter 9 of the book, that the Roman procurator Pontius Pilate expended the money stored in the temple treasury, having been offered as Korban, on the construction of an aqueduct. His action caused a riot, which his forces violently suppressed.

== See also ==
- Qurban
- Eid al-Adha
- Holy Qurbana
- Kourbania
- Dušni Brav
- Red heifer
- Incense offering
- Wave offering

== Bibliography ==
- Bleich, J. David. "A Review of Halakhic Literature Pertaining to the Reinstitution of the Sacrificial Order." Tradition 9 (1967): 103–24.
- Myers, Jody Elizabeth. "Attitudes Towards a Resumption of Sacrificial Worship in the Nineteenth Century." Modern Judaism 7, no. 1 (1987): 29–49.
- Ticker, Jay. The Centrality of Sacrifices as an Answer to Reform in the Thought of Zvi Hirsch Kalischer. Vol. 15, Working Papers in Yiddish and East European Studies, 1975
