= Holocaust (sacrifice) =

Ritual burning of animals

A holocaust is a religious animal sacrifice that is completely consumed by fire, also known as a burnt offering. The word derives from the ancient Greek holokaustos, the form of sacrifice in which the victim was reduced to ash, as distinguished from an animal sacrifice that resulted in a communal meal.

The Greek holocausts were apotropaic rituals, intended to appease the spirits of the Greek Underworld, including the Greek heroes. Holocausts were also given to dangerous powers, such as the Keres and Hecate. The same term was used in the Koine Greek Septuagint to translate the Hebrew olah. This form of sacrifice, in which no meat was left over for anyone, was seen as the greatest form of sacrifice Jewish holocausts was the form of sacrifice permitted to be given solely at the Temple in Jerusalem by both Jews and non-Jews. Most biblical scholars now agree that the intricate details of the whole offering, particularly the types and number of animals on occasion of various feast days, given by the Torah, were of a late origin, as were the intricate directions given in the Talmud. Whole offerings were quite rare in early times, but they became more prominent as the ritual became more fixed and statutory in nature.

== Etymology and usage ==
The word holocaust derives from the Middle English holocaust, which derived from the Anglo-Norman holocauste and Late Latin holocaustum. Its original root was the neuter form of the ancient Greek holokaustos (ὁλόκαυστος), from ὅλος (hólos, “whole”) + καυστός (kaustós, "burnt") or καίω (kaíō, "I burn") with the use of rough breathing to pronounce the leading h.

== Greek sacrifice ==
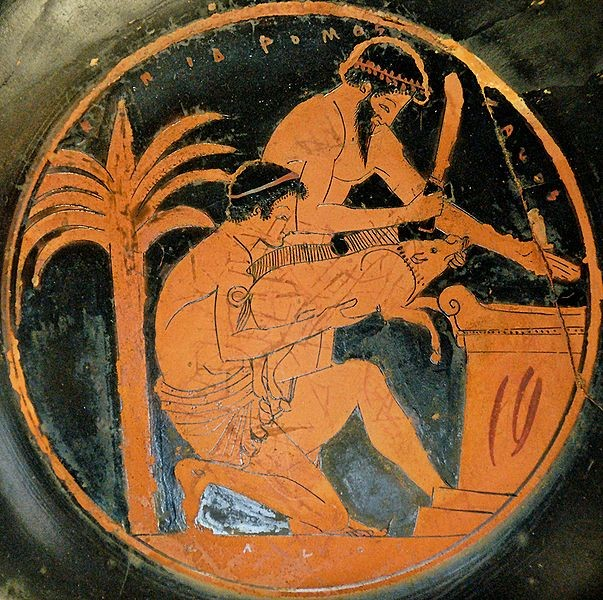
Sacrifice of a pig to Demeter (tondo from an Attic red-figure kylix, c. 510–500 BC

Holokautein (ὁλοκαυτεῖν) is one of the two chief verbs of Greek sacrifice, in which the victim is utterly destroyed and burnt up, as opposed to thúesthai (θύεσθαι), to share a meal with the god and one's fellow worshippers, commensal sacrifice. In the latter, the edible parts of the sacrificed animal were roasted and distributed for festive celebration, whereas the inedible parts were burned on the altar, those being the god's share. Although not actually obliged to do so, Greeks would rather sacrifice a domestic animal to a god or hero and then proceed to use its flesh as food than simply consume it without a sacrifice, as animals were thought of as sharing in the sanctity of life, in addition to their secular usefulness (milk, eggs, ploughing). This did not apply to game, fish, and other seafood, which formed a far larger proportion of the diet than they do today – fish was the major foodstuff sold in ancient Greek marketplaces. A sacrifice need not be a public function involving priests and altars; they could also be held privately, domestically or individually.

These are the two ideal types of Greek sacrificial ritual; they are appropriate to different divinities, done for different purposes, and conducted by different methods. Holocausts are apotropaic rituals, intended to appease the spirits of the Underworld, including the Greek heroes, who are spirits of the dead; they are also given to dangerous powers, such as the Keres and Hecate. One of the earliest attested holocausts was Xenophon's offering of pigs to Zeus Meilichius.

Holocausts are conducted at night, without wine, and offer black-hided animals at a low altar, with their heads directed downwards; in all these they are opposed to the commensal sacrifice given to the Olympian gods. (This distinction is between extreme types, and was somewhat exaggerated in the early twentieth century, as by Jane Harrison; considerable evidence has also been found of commensal sacrifice offered to heroes.)

== Jewish sacrifice ==
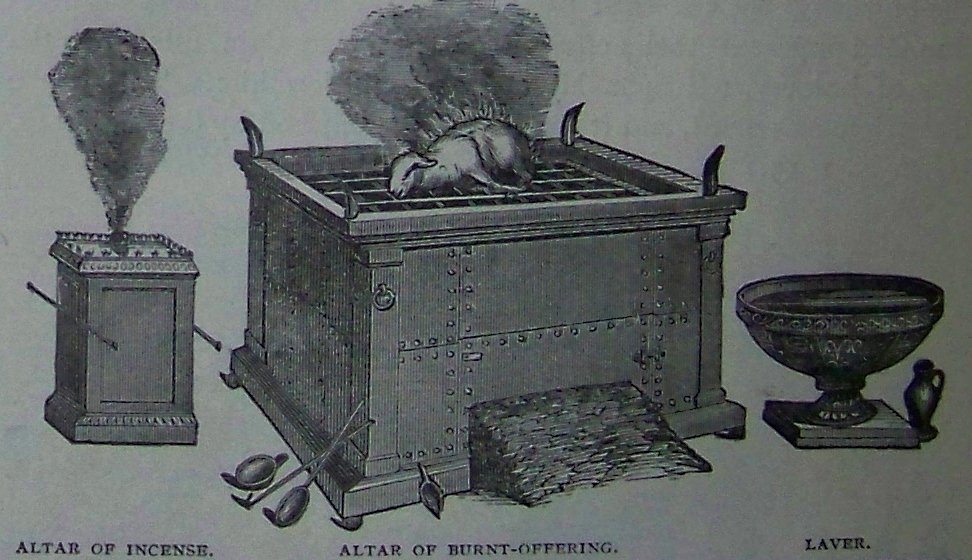
The Altar of Incense, Altar of Burnt-Offering, and Laver from the biblical Tabernacle; illustration from the 1890 Holman Bible

A "burnt offering" is a type of korban (sacrifice), specifically an animal sacrifice in which the entire sacrifice is consumed totally by fire. When the Jewish scriptures were translated into the Koine Greek Septuagint, the translators used the Greek term holokautein to translate the Hebrew olah. This form of sacrifice, in which no meat was left over for anyone, was seen as the greatest form of sacrifice and was the form of sacrifice permitted to be given solely at the Temple by Jews and non-Jews.

The "whole offering" is believed to have evolved as an extreme form of the slaughter offering, in which the portion allocated to the deity increased to all of it. In slaughter offerings, the portion allocated to the deity was mainly the fat, the part which can most easily be burnt.

The animals, having first been checked to ensure they were free from disease and unblemished (a requirement of the sacrifice), were brought to the north side of the altar, and killed by either the offeror, or a priest. The animal's blood was carefully collected by priests and sprinkled around the altar. Unless the animal was a bird, its corpse was flayed and the skin given to the priest, who was permitted to keep it. In later times more powerful priests took possession of the skins from the lesser priests, and it was decreed that the skins should be sold, with the proceeds being given to the Temple in Jerusalem (Tosefta 19). The flesh of the animal was divided according to detailed instructions given by the Talmud (Tamid 31), and would then be placed on the wood on the altar (which was constantly alight due to the large number of sacrifices carried out daily), and slowly burnt. After the flesh (including any horns and goats' beards) had been reduced to ashes, usually the following morning, the ashes were taken by the priest to a ritually clean location outside the sanctuary, and dumped there.

Most biblical scholars now agree that the intricate details of the whole offering, particularly the types and number of animals on occasion of various feast days, given by the Torah, were of a late origin, as were the intricate directions given in the Talmud. Whole offerings were quite rare in early times, but as the ritual became more fixed and statutory, and the concentration of sacrifice into a single sanctuary (particularly after Josiah's reform) made sacrifices quite distinct from simply killing animals for food, whole offerings gradually rose to great prominence.

== See also ==
- Anthrozoology – Subset of ethnobiology
- Fire worship – Worship or deification of fire
- Hecatomb – Sacrifice of 100 cattle
- Jingxiang – Ritual of offering incense accompanied by tea and/or fruits
- Libation – Ritual offering
- Oblation – Church offering
- Tophet – Child sacrifice sites and cemeteries
