= Guilt offering =

Biblical sacrifice

A guilt offering (Hebrew: אשם, romanized: ’āšām, lit. 'guilt, trespass'; plural ashamot), also referred to as a trespass offering (KJV, 1611), was a type of Biblical sacrifice, specifically a sacrifice made as a compensation payment for unintentional and certain intentional transgressions. It was distinct from the Biblical sin offering.

== Hebrew Bible ==
Guilt offerings or trespass offerings were mandated in Leviticus, chapters 5 to 7, where references are made to the offering "for sin" or "for sins". In the Greek Septuagint, the phrase used is the offering peri tes plemmeleias (περὶ τῆς πλημμελείας).

The guilt offering is to be slaughtered in the place where the burnt offering is slaughtered, and its blood is to be splashed against the sides of the altar.

— Leviticus 7:2, NIV

The transgressor furnished an unblemished ram for sacrifice at the Temple in Jerusalem, as well as (in cases of sins against holy items, theft, commission of fraud or false oaths) monetary compensation to the victim for their loss, plus a mark-up of 20% of the value to cover the priest's earnings. Monetary restitution had to be given in the pre-exile version of the currency (the shekel of the sanctuary), rather than the currency of the time, giving rise to a need for currency exchange in the Temple (hence the New Testament narrative of Jesus and the Money Changers).

Such compensation payments were given on occasion of:

- infringing the rights of the priests to portions of other sacrifices (referred to in the text as God's holy things)
- committing an unknown sin - as these infringements were uncertain and possibly had not occurred at all, this was voluntary (just in case) and there was no restitution element
- swearing falsely in a matter concerning money

This was also given as part of the purification process for tzaraath.

Guilt offerings are mentioned in 1 Samuel 6:3. The Philistines are told by priests and fortune-tellers to make an offerings of five golden mice and five golden hemorrhoids in hopes of ending the mice and hemorrhoids that had plagued them since taking the ark of God from Israel. The images of golden mice and golden hemorrhoids are used in the offering.

== English Translations ==
Translations of the Old Testament which use the phrase 'Guilt Offering' include the English Standard Version (ESV), New International Version (NIV) and Revised Standard Version (RSV). Translations which use the phrase 'Trespass Offering' include the 1599 Geneva Bible, King James Version (KJV) and New King James Version (NKJV), the Wycliffe Bible and the American Standard Version (ASV).

The Good News Bible (GNT) uses the phrase 'Repayment Offering'.
