= Thank offering =

The thank offering (Hebrew: תֹּודָה, pronounced Todah) or sacrifice of thanksgiving (Hebrew zevakh hatodah זֶבַח הַתֹּודָה ) was an optional offering under the Law of Moses. This is also termed the "thanksgiving offering."

If he offer it for a thanksgiving, then he shall offer with the sacrifice of thanksgiving unleavened cakes mingled with oil, and unleavened wafers anointed with oil, and cakes mingled with oil, of fine flour, fried.

— Lev 7:12 KJV

The Hebrew noun todah "thanksgiving" is derived from the Hiphil of the verb yadah (יָדָה) "to praise."
