= Drink offering =

Form of libation

The drink offering (Hebrew: נֶסֶך, nesekh) was a form of libation forming one of the sacrifices and offerings of the Law of Moses.

== Etymology ==
The Hebrew noun nesekh is formed from the Qal form of the verb nasakh, "to pour," hence "thing poured." The verb and the noun frequently come together, such as nasakh [aleha] nesekh, literally "pour [on it] a poured thing" as in the only pre-Exodus use, that of Jacob's libation at a pillar in Genesis 35:14. The etymology "poured thing" explains the existence of the rarer secondary use of the verb nasakh for "cast" (an idol), and the noun nesekh for a "thing poured" (also an idol).

== Hebrew Bible ==
The drink offering accompanied various sacrifices and offerings on various feast days. Usually the offering was of wine, but in one instance also of "strong drink" (Numbers 28:7). This "strong drink" (Hebrew shekhar שֵׁכָר, Septuagint sikera σίκερα as Luke 1:15, but also methusma in Judges 13:4 and Micah 2:11) is not identified.

=== Mishnaic tradition ===
The Mishnah (Menachot chapter 8) mentions the places in the Land of Israel and in Transjordan where the finest of the grains, olive harvest and vintage wines were taken as an offertory to the Temple in Jerusalem. Among wine libations, the finest wine was said to have come from Keruthin and Hattulim (ibid., Menachot 8:6), this latter place now tentatively identified by historical geographer Samuel Klein with the ruin directly west of Sha'ar Hagai (Bâb el Wâd) called Kh. Khâtûleh (variant spelling: Kh. Khâtûla), now known locally as Giv'at Ḥatul. Second in rank to this place was Beit Rima and Beit Luban, both places identified in Samaria. The wine from any country was valid, but they used to bring it only from these places. The drink offerings were poured out near the altar on the Temple Mount, where they fell down into a subterraneous cavern (Hebrew: שִׁית), in fulfillment of the Scripture (Numbers 28:7): "In the Holy Place you shall pour out a drink offering of strong drink to the Lord."

In the Temple at Jerusalem, they were not permitted to bring wine that had been sweetened or smoked or cooked and if they did so it was invalid. By a rabbinic injunction, an unsealed flagon of wine prepared by an Israelite, but which had been kept under watch or in store by a heathen, is considered a forbidden libation (Hebrew: יין נסך), which must be discarded. The kashrut requirements for wine are designed to prevent the accidental or intentional use of wine previously dedicated or blessed for idolatrous use. However, an unsealed flagon of wine that had been cooked or of conditum (both of which prepared by an Israelite), since both are unfit for the altar, even though they had been watched or kept in store by a heathen, can still be consumed by an Israelite.

=== Ancient Near East parallels ===
In Akkadian texts, and Ugaritic epics there are references to libations, and sometimes the same verb stem N-S-K "to pour" is used. Psalm 16:4 gives reference to a "drink offering" of blood among pagans, but generally in ANE religions libations were also of wine.

=== Rabbinical interpretation ===
In the Talmud the view of Rabbi Meir was that the blood of the sacrifices permits the drink offering to the altar (B. Zeb. 44a).

== Other offerings ==
An ofrenda (Spanish: "offering") is the offering placed in a home altar during the annual and traditionally Mexican Día de los Muertos celebration. An ofrenda, which may be quite large and elaborate, is usually created by the family members of a person who has died and is intended to welcome the deceased to the altar setting. For deceased adults in ofrenda, the ofrenda might include a bottle or poured shot glasses of tequila or mezcal.
