= Peace offering =

Sacrifice in the Hebrew Bible

The peace offering (Hebrew: זֶבַח שְׁלָמִים, romanized: zeḇaḥ šəlāmīm) was one of the sacrifices and offerings in the Hebrew Bible (Leviticus 3; 7.11–34). The term "peace offering" is generally constructed from "slaughter offering" zevah and the plural of shelem (זֶבַח הַשְּׁלָמִים zevah hashelamiym), but is sometimes found without zevah as shelamim plural alone. The term korban shelamim (קורבן שלמים) is also used in rabbinical writings. In English Bible versions the term is rendered "peace offering" (KJV 1611, JPS 1917), "offering of well-being" (NRSV).

Parallels of offerings with the same semitic root S-L-M also occur in Ugaritic texts. After the Hebrew Bible the term also occurs in the Dead Sea scrolls, for example in the Temple Scroll. In the Septuagint, the term is rendered by two different Greek nouns. First in the Pentateuch, Joshua, Judges variations of soterios ("of saving"); in Samuel and Kings variations of eirenikos ("of peace").

== See also ==
- Slaughter offering
