= Gift offering =

Type of sacrifice in the Hebrew Bible

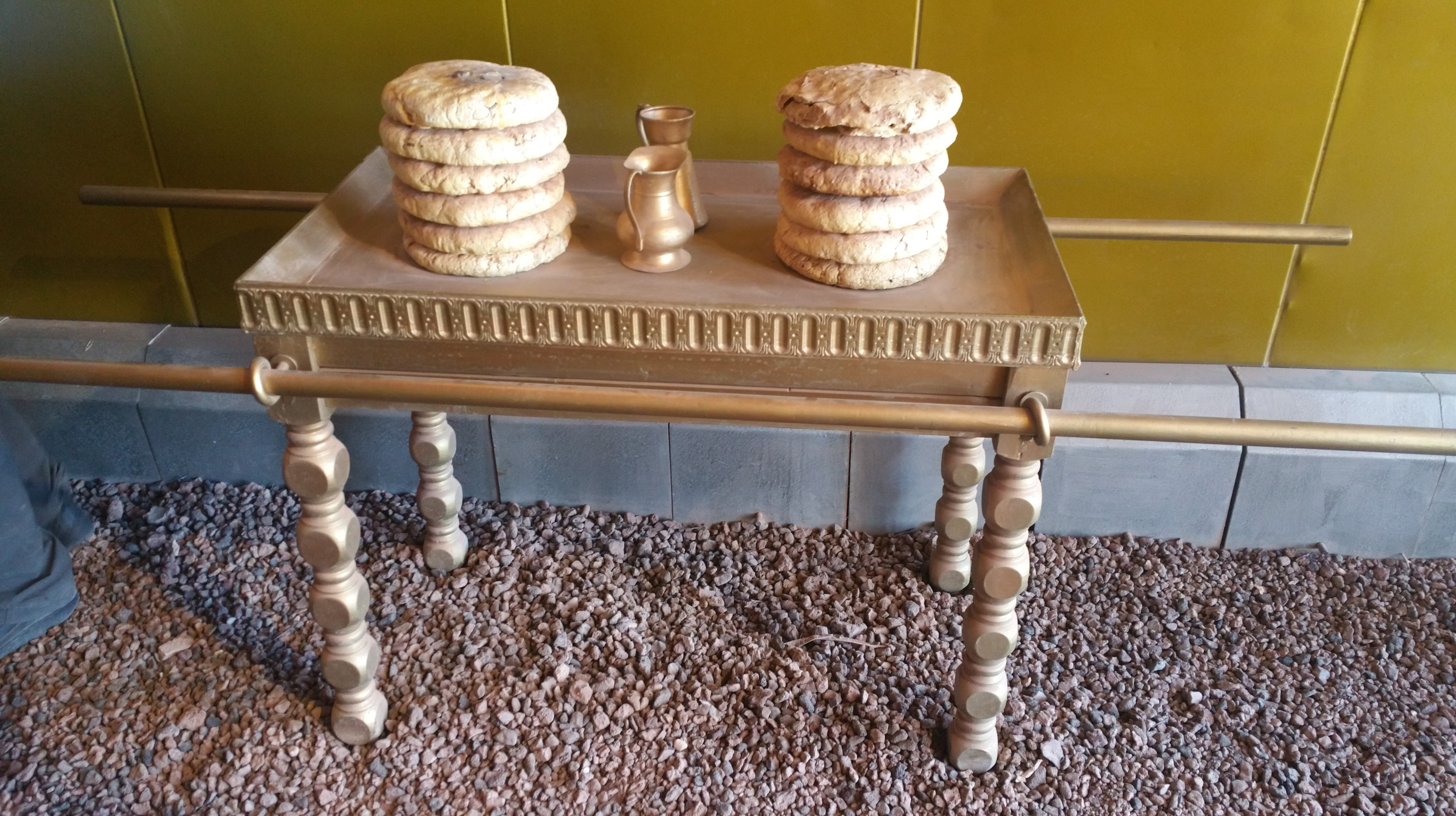
Example of Jewish Gift Offering

A meal offering, grain offering, or gift offering (Biblical Hebrew: מנחה, minkhah), is a type of Biblical sacrifice, specifically a sacrifice that did not include sacrificial animals. In older English it is sometimes called an oblation, from Latin.

The Hebrew noun minkhah (מִנְחָה) is used 211 times in the Masoretic Text of the Hebrew Bible with the first instances being the minkhah offered by both Cain and Abel in Genesis 4:3-5. It is also used of Jacob's "present" to Esau in Genesis 32 and again of the "present" to the Egyptian ruler (who was in fact Joseph, his own son) in Genesis 43.

In the King James Version of 1611 this was rendered as "meat offerings", e.g. in Exodus 29:41, since at the time the King James Version was written, meat referred to food in general rather than the flesh of animals in particular.

== In the Hebrew Bible ==
Gift offerings were often made on their own, but also accompanied the burnt offering. Scholars believe that the term "gift offering" originally referred to all voluntary sacrifices, but that it later came to just refer to non-meat offerings.

The quintessential "gift offering" was one of grain (not just high quality flour), frankincense, and oil. The grain could either be raw and mixed with oil, or mixed with oil and cooked into unleavened bread, or cooked into wafers and spread with oil. According to Menachos 76a ten such cakes of bread had to be made for each offering (except for the meal-offering of fine flour). A portion of this was then burnt on the altar, along with the frankincense, while the remainder was allocated to the priests, who were to eat it within the sanctuary.

== See also ==
- Dough offering
