= Eleazar of Modi'im =

Late 1st/early 2nd century Judean Jewish scholar

Eleazar of Modi'im (Hebrew: אלעזר המודעי) was a Jewish scholar of the second tannaitic generation (1st and 2nd centuries), disciple of Johanan ben Zakkai, and contemporary of Joshua ben Hananiah and Eliezer ben Hyrcanus.

== Rabbinic career ==
Eleazar of Modi'im was an expert aggadist and frequently discussed exegetical topics with his distinguished contemporaries. Gamaliel II often deferred to Eleazar's interpretations, admitting, "The Moda'i's views are still indispensable".

Few of his teachings are preserved in halakha and most of what is known about him comes from hearsay. As he lived through the Hadrianic persecutions and the Bar Kokba insurrection, many of his homilies refer, explicitly or implicitly, to existence under such conditions. Eleazar expressed his confidence in Providence in this comment on the biblical statement (Exodus 16:4), "the people shall go out, and gather a certain rate every day" (lit. "the portion of the day on its day," דבר יום ביומו): "He who creates the day creates its sustenance." From this verse he also argued, "He who is possessed of food for the day, and worries over what he may have to eat the next day, is wanting in faith; therefore the Bible adds [ib.], 'that I may prove them, whether they will walk in my law, or not'".

Eleazar's final days were during the insurrection headed by Bar Kochba. According to rabbinic tradition, he died in the besieged city of Betar:

During the Roman siege R. Eleazar of Modi'im fasted and prayed daily that God might not strictly judge the people that day nor surrender the city to the enemy, because of the sins of the inhabitants. The siege being protracted, and no immediate conquest being in prospect, the Roman commander meditated on withdrawing, when a Samaritan persuaded him to wait a while, and offered his services to aid in subduing the apparently unconquerable Jews by stratagem—by creating a suspicion of treachery among the besieged against Eleazar. 'For,' argued he, 'as long as this hen wallows in ashes [as long as Eleazar by his prayers encourages in the people the hope of God's protection], so long will Betar remain impregnable.' Thereupon he smuggled himself into the city through some subterranean ducts, and, approaching Eleazar, who was engaged in prayer, pretended to whisper into his ear a secret message. Those present, regarding this mysterious movement with suspicion, soon reported it to Bar Kokba, and declared, 'Eleazar intends to establish peace between the city and Hadrian.' Bar Kochba had the Samaritan brought before him and interrogated him on the import of his conversation with the sage; but the Samaritan replied, 'If I reveal the royal secrets to thee, the commander will kill me; and if I refrain, thou wilt kill me. I would rather kill myself than betray my king's secrets.' Bar Kokba then summoned Eleazar and questioned him; but Eleazar protested that he had been absorbed in devotional exercises, and had heard nothing. This increased Bar Kokba's suspicion of meditated treason, and aroused him to such anger that he kicked Eleazar, in consequence of which the aged sage, enfeebled by fasting and prayer, fell dead.

The story adds that a bat ḳol (heavenly voice) thereupon pronounced the immediate doom of the chief of the insurrection and of the beleaguered city, which soon came to pass.

== Jewish Encyclopedia bibliography ==
- W. Bacher, Ag. Tan. i. 194;
- Brüll, Mebo ha-Mishnah, i. 130;
- Z. Frankel, Darke ha-Mishnah, p. 127;
- Hamburger, R. B. T. ii. 161;
- Heilprin, Seder ha-Dorot, ii., s.v.;
- Weiss, Dor, ii. 130;
- Zacuto, Yuḥasin, ed. Filipowski, p. 33a.
