= Simeon ben Gamliel =

1st century CE rabbi and nasi

Rabban Simeon ben Gamliel I
- שמעון בן גמליאל הראשון
- Simeon ben Gamliel I, artwork by Ben-Zion

Personal life
- Born: c. 10 BCE Jerusalem, Judea, Roman Empire
- Died: c. 70 CE (aged 80) Jerusalem, Judea, Roman Empire
- Buried: Kafr Kanna, Galilee (traditional)
- Children: Rabban Gamliel of Yavneh, Imma Shalom
- Parent: Gamaliel the Elder (father)
- Dynasty: House of Hillel
- Occupation: Nasi, Tanna; Second Temple period

Religious life
- Religion: Judaism

Jewish leader
- Predecessor: Gamaliel the Elder
- Successor: Yohanan ben Zakkai
- Main work: Pirkei Avot, Mishnah
- Other: Leader during the First Jewish–Roman War, martyrdom, last Nasi before the destruction of the Second Temple
- Dynasty: House of Hillel

Simeon ben Gamliel (I) (Hebrew: שמעון בן גמליאל or רשב"ג הראשון; c. 10 BCE – 70 CE) was a Tanna (sage) and leader of the Jewish people during the outbreak of the First Jewish–Roman War and just before the destruction of the Second Temple.

== Family ==
Simeon was the great-grandson of Hillel the Elder and the son of Gamliel the Elder. His son was Rabban Gamliel of Yavneh. His daughter, Imma Shalom, married Rabbi Eliezer ben Hurcanus, one of the greatest students of Rabban Yochanan ben Zakkai (Babylonian Talmud, Bava Metzia 59b).

His name, Shimon, was the same as that of his grandfather, Shimon ben Hillel, and his grandson, Rabban Shimon ben Gamliel (the second). In rabbinic literature, he is referred to as "Rabban Shimon ben Gamliel the Elder" or "Rashbag the Martyr" to distinguish him from his grandson. However, at times he appears simply as "Rabban Shimon ben Gamliel," which creates confusion in distinguishing him from his grandson.

== Life ==
Rabban Shimon ben Gamliel was born in Jerusalem during the Second Temple period.

In Rabbinical tradition Simeon was considered Nasi (President) of the Sanhedrin, the last Nasi during the Second Temple era. The Talmud (Babylonian Talmud, Shabbat 15a) quotes a Baraita:

Hillel, Shimon, Gamliel, and Shimon (this is Rashbag the Elder) held the position of Nasi in the presence of the Temple for 100 years.

During his time, the Sanhedrin was located in Jerusalem, but not in its traditional place, the Chamber of Hewn Stone, rather in the first exile of the Sanhedrin – shops on the Temple Mount, where the Sanhedrin had moved during the days of his father.

Josephus describes him in his autobiography:

A man of noble lineage from the Pharisees... He was a wise and intelligent man, and with his wisdom, he could resolve complicated matters.

=== During the Great Revolt ===
During his life, the Great Revolt against the Romans broke out. Simeon was part of the moderate camp, alongside Rabban Yochanan ben Zakkai, and was close to the moderate revolutionary government that was established at the beginning of the revolt. According to Josephus, Simeon supported the revolt, despite being in the moderate camp:

The distinguished men among the people, Gurion ben Joseph and Simeon ben Gamliel, gathered the people for an assembly, implored them to hasten vengeance upon the enemies of freedom, and to cleanse the Temple of bloodshed.

Josephus praises Simeon, but immediately afterward, he recounts that Simeon sought his removal from the position of military governor of Galilee, a position he had been appointed to by the revolutionary government. According to Josephus, he and Simeon was a friend of John of Gischala, Josephus’s rival, and Simeon agreed to John’s request to persuade the high priests Ananus ben Ananus and Joshua ben Gamla and others to dismiss Josephus. However, Ananus decided not to rush without evidence. Josephus claims that Simeon did not give up on his efforts and accuses him of a conspiracy: Simeon instructed John's brother to send gifts to Ananus and his faction to change their minds, and they decided to send envoys to Galilee to dismiss Josephus without the government’s knowledge. According to Josephus, this action caused great anger in Jerusalem toward Simeon and Ananus. The moderate revolutionary government did not last long and was overthrown by the Zealots.

== Death ==
Simeon was killed during the revolt, as mentioned in the writings of the Geonim:

Rabban Gamliel the Elder, and his son Rabban Shimon who was killed during the destruction of the Second Temple, and Rabban Yochanan ben Zakkai, all served as Nasi.

According to tradition, Shmuel HaKatan prophesied Rabban Shimon ben Gamliel's death at the time of his own passing, saying:

"Shimon and Yishmael will be killed by the sword, and their companions will be killed by other means, while the rest of the people will be plundered, and great afflictions will come upon the world." (Babylonian Talmud, Sotah 48b).

In translation, as explained by Rashi, this refers to Rabban Shimon ben Gamliel and Rabbi Yishmael ben Elisha the High Priest being killed by the sword, with their fellow rabbis executed by other methods, and great calamities befalling the Jewish people.

Rabban Shimon is counted among the Ten Martyrs who were executed by the Romans. According to tradition, he was executed along with Rabbi Yishmael ben Elisha on the 25th of Sivan, as recorded in the Arba'ah Turim (Orach Chaim, Siman 580).

Rabbi Aharon Hyman suggests that Rabban Shimon may have been executed by the Zealots due to his opposition to their radical methods, though this view lacks direct support from rabbinic sources.

In the Minor Tractates, it is recorded in Tractate Semachot (Chapter 8) that before their execution, one of them began to weep. His companion asked,

"Why do you weep? After all, you are but two steps away from the portion of the righteous." The weeping man replied, "I weep because we are being executed like idolaters, Shabbat desecrators, and murderers." His companion then asked, "Rabbi, perhaps you were once eating or sleeping when a woman came to inquire about her niddah status, and you told her to wait until you were finished? For the Torah says: 'Do not afflict any widow or orphan, and if you afflict them... I will kill you by the sword.'"

In an earlier source, a similar story is recounted:

"When Rabban Shimon ben Gamliel and Rabbi Yishmael were taken to be executed, Rabban Shimon ben Gamliel reflected and said, 'Woe to us, for we are being executed like Shabbat desecrators, idolaters, adulterers, and murderers...'. They pleaded with the executioner, with one saying, 'I am a Kohen, son of a Kohen Gadol. Kill me first so that I do not witness the death of my friend.' The other replied, 'I am a Nasi, son of a Nasi. Kill me first so that I do not witness the death of my friend.' The executioner cast lots, and the lot fell on Rabban Shimon ben Gamliel. Immediately, he took the sword and severed his head. Rabbi Yishmael took his head, placed it in his lap, and wept, crying: 'Holy mouth, faithful mouth, holy mouth, faithful mouth, the mouth that produced wonderful words of Torah and precious jewels, who has buried you in the dust? Who has filled your tongue with ashes? On you the verse is fulfilled: "Awake, O sword, against My shepherd, and against the man that is close to Me" (Zechariah 13:7).

The news of their deaths reached Rabbi Akiva and Rabbi Yehuda ben Beteira, who tore their garments and lamented:

Our brothers, Israel, if there were any good left for the world, it would have been received by Rabban Shimon and Rabbi Yishmael. Now, it is evident before the One Who spoke and the world came into being that great calamities are destined to befall the world, and therefore these righteous men were taken from the world so that they would not witness the coming disasters.

The Romans sought to kill Simeon's son, Gamaliel II, as well. Rabban Yochanan ben Zakkai requested mercy on his behalf, and they agreed. After the execution of Rabban Shimon, Rabban Yochanan ben Zakkai assumed the leadership for a few years, during which he enacted several decrees to uplift the people after the destruction of the Temple, moving the center of Jewish scholarship from Jerusalem to Yavneh. He later passed the position on to Gamaliel II.

== Famous deeds and practices ==
Only a few teachings are attributed to Rabban Shimon, but part of his Torah is quoted as the teachings of the "House of Hillel".

=== His Teachings in Pirkei Avot ===
The following teaching in Pirkei Avot is attributed to Rabban Shimon:

"Shimon his son said: All my days I have grown up among the wise, and I have found nothing better for the body than silence. Study is not the most important thing, but action. And whoever increases words brings sin." (Pirkei Avot 1:16 or 17 in some editions).

This identification comes from the Tosafot Yom Tov's commentary on this Mishnah, which emphasizes that this refers to the son of Rabban Gamliel the Elder, as opposed to Rabban Shimon ben Gamliel the second.

=== Joy of the Festival ===
Rabban Shimon's participation in the Simchat Beit HaShoeva held in the Temple during Sukkot is well known. The Talmud states:

It was said about Rabban Shimon ben Gamliel that when he rejoiced at the Simchat Beit Ha Shoeva, he would take eight torches of fire and juggle them, tossing one and catching another, and they did not touch one another. And when he bowed, he would plant his two thumbs into the ground, bend over, kiss the ground, and straighten up, and no creature could perform this feat as he did.

=== Lowering the Price of Bird Offerings ===
One of Rabban Shimon's most famous actions was his decree regarding the prices of bird offerings. A "ken" (bird offering) consists of a pair of turtledoves or young pigeons, which were required as a sacrifice for a woman after childbirth, for a leper, and in other circumstances.

The Mishnah (Keritot 1:7) recounts:

"It once happened that the price of bird offerings in Jerusalem rose to a gold denar." The price was exorbitantly high for the time (equivalent to 25 silver denars). Rabban Shimon ben Gamliel proclaimed: "By this sanctuary! I will not go to bed tonight until they are sold for a silver denar." He entered the Beit Din and decreed: "A woman who has five certain births or five certain cases of Zavah (not in doubt), brings only one offering for one birth or one discharge, and she may then eat sacrifices (as she is considered ritually pure), and she is not required to bring the remaining offerings."

This ruling was exceptional, as originally the woman would be obligated to bring offerings for all her births or discharges. However, Rabban Shimon leniently ruled in this case based on the principle of "It is time to act for the Lord, they have made void Thy law" (Psalms 119:126), to prevent those obligated to bring offerings from abstaining due to the high prices.

The Mishnah concludes: "That day, the price of bird offerings dropped to a quarter of the original price," meaning they were reduced significantly, either to a quarter of a silver denar or to half of a silver denar, depending on the interpretation. This significant reduction in price made it affordable for the general population to bring their required sacrifices, thereby ensuring that individuals would fulfill their religious obligations without financial hardship.

== Tomb ==
According to a later tradition, his tomb is located in Kafr Kanna, in the Galilee. During the October 2000 riots, the tomb was set on fire by Arab rioters.

Preceded by Gamliel I	Nasi; 50–70	Succeeded by Johanan ben Zakkai
