= Rabbi Zadok =

Tanna of the second generation of the Tannaic era

Rabbi Zadok (Hebrew: רבי צדוק) was a Tanna of the second generation of the Tannaic era, a contemporary of Joshua ben Hananiah and Eliezer ben Hurcanus, descending from Tribe of Benjamin.

Rabbi Zadok was one of the notable Tannaim of his generation, and his opinion on many matters is often cited in the Talmud.

Forty years before the destruction of the Second Temple, he observed fasts in order that Jerusalem might not be destroyed, and would eat only at night, and when the Romans encircled Jerusalem in order to destroy it, Johanan ben Zakai had only three requests from Vespasian, and one of them was to give him medicine measures to heal Rabbi Zadok. The Talmud in tractate Gittin elaborates on the ways Rabbi Zadok was healed.

His son was Rabbi Eleazar Bar Zadok.
