= Eleazar ben Azariah =

1st-century CE Jewish rabbi and Tannaim sage

Eleazar ben Azariah (Hebrew: אלעזר בן עזריה) was a 1st-century CE Jewish tanna, i.e. Mishnaic sage. He was of the second generation and a junior contemporary of Gamaliel II, Eliezer b. Hyrcanus, Joshua b. Hananiah, and Akiva.

== Biography ==
He was a kohen who traced his pedigree ten generations back to Ezra, and was very wealthy. When Gamaliel II was temporarily deposed from the patriarchate due to his provoking demeanor, Eleazar, though still young, was elected to that office. The stress of the position is said to have caused his beard to sprout 18 strands of white hair overnight, thus proving him worthy. He did not, however, occupy it for any length of time, for the Sanhedrin reinstated Gamaliel. Nevertheless he was retained as vice-president ("ab bet din"), and it was arranged that Gamaliel should lecture three (some say two) Sabbaths, and Eleazar every fourth (or third) Sabbath.

He once journeyed to Rome along with Gamaliel II, Rabbi Yehoshua, and Rabbi Akiva. Neither the object of the journey nor the result of the mission is stated, but that affairs important as pressing were involved is apparent from the season at which the journey was undertaken: they celebrated Sukkot aboard the ship. With the same companions Eleazar once visited the ruins of the Temple at Jerusalem. On a visit to the aged Dosa b. Harkinas the latter joyfully exclaimed, "In him I see the fulfillment of the Scriptural saying: 'I have been young, and now am old; yet have I not seen the righteous forsaken, nor his seed begging bread'", The latter was amassed by dealing in wine, oil, and cattle. Subsequent generations entertained the belief that dreaming of Eleazar b. Azariah presaged the acquisition of wealth.

While he lived he enjoyed the glowing praise of his famous colleagues, who said, "That generation in which Eleazar b. Azariah flourishes can not be termed orphan". When he died, the learned said, "With the death of R. Eleazar b. Azariah was removed the crown of the sages".

== Teachings ==
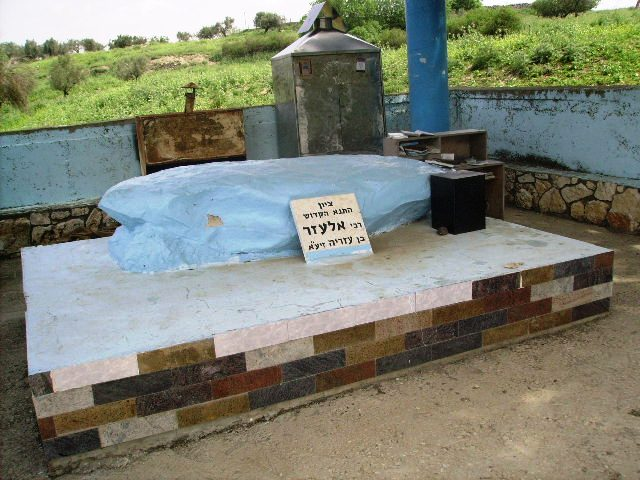
Grave of Eleazar ben Azariah, Galilee, Israel.

With Eleazar's accession to the patriarchate, the gates of the academy were opened to all who sought admittance. It is said that three hundred benches had to be added for the accommodation of the eager throngs which pressed into the halls of learning. Under his presidency, too, a review of undecided points of law was undertaken.

Rabbinic homiletics owes to Eleazar the introduction of the rule called semuchin (סמוכין = "contiguous"), by which one Scriptural passage is explained or supplemented by another immediately preceding or succeeding it. Thus, Eleazar declares that the slanderer and the listener and the false witness deserve to be thrown to the dogs. He derives this idea from the juxtaposition of the expression, "Ye shall cast it to the dogs," and the prohibition against raising false reports, bearing false witness, and associating with the false witness.

In his homilies he generally aims to bring out some ethical or practical lesson.

- With reference to the Day of Atonement the Bible says, "On that day ... ye may be clean (Hebrew: תטהרו = "ye shall cleanse yourselves") from all your sins before the Lord." From this verse, Eleazar concludes that the efficacy of the day extends only to sins against God, while sins against man are not forgiven unless the offended party has first been reconciled.
- The Bible says, "Thou shalt not abhor an Egyptian ... because thou wast a stranger in his land." On this verse Eleazar remarked, "The Egyptians admitted the Israelites out of self-interest; nevertheless God accounts their act as one of merit. Now, if he who unintentionally confers a favor is accorded a token of merit, how much more so he who intentionally does a good deed".
- Similar is his deduction from Deuteronomy 24:19, which says, "When thou cuttest down thine harvest in thy field, and hast forgot a sheaf in the field, thou shalt not go again to fetch it: it shall be for the stranger, for the fatherless, and for the widow: that the Lord thy God may bless thee in all the work of thine hands." "Here," argues Eleazar, "the Bible promises blessings to him by whom a good deed is done unintentionally; hence if one unwittingly loses money, and a needy one finds it and sustains life thereon, God will bless the loser for it".

=== Biblical interpretations ===
Eleazar was independent in his Biblical interpretations. He often rejected Akiva's opinions, remarking, "Even if thou persist the whole day in extending and limiting (see Hermeneutics), I shall not harken to thee", or, "Turn from the Aggadah and betake thee to the laws affecting leprosy and the defilement of tents" (ואהלות נגעים;). Above all, he strove to be methodical. When one applied to him for information on a Biblical topic, he furnished that; was he called upon to explain a mishnah, a halakah, or an aggadah, he explained each point. Eleazar was opposed to frequent sentences of capital punishment. In his opinion a court that averages more than one execution in the course of seventy years is a murderous court.

=== Wisdom ===
The following few sentences summarize Eleazar's practical philosophy:

- "Where there is no study of the Torah there is no seemly behaviour; where there is no seemly behaviour there is no study of the Torah. Where there is no wisdom there is no fear of God; where there is no fear of God there is no wisdom. Where there is no discernment there is no learning; without learning there is no discernment. Where there is a want of bread, study of the Torah can not thrive; without study of the Torah there is a lack of bread."
- "With what is he to be compared who possesses more knowledge than good deeds? With a tree of many branches and but few roots. A storm comes and plucks it up and turns it over. Thus also Scripture says, 'He shall be like the heath in the desert, and shall not see when good cometh; but shall inhabit the parched places in the wilderness, in a salt land and not inhabited.' But what does he resemble who can show more good deeds than learning? A tree of few branches and many roots. Even should all the winds of heaven rage against it, they could not move it from its place. Thus, the Bible says, 'He shall be as a tree planted by the waters, that spreadeth out her roots by the river, and shall not see when heat cometh, but her leaf shall be green; and shall not be careful in the year of drought, neither shall cease from yielding fruit'"

=== Modern critical study ===
According to a form-critical analysis performed by modern scholar Tzvee Zahavy, while Eleazar's rulings as recorded in the Mishnah and Tosefta fit the context of the chapters in which they appear, nevertheless Eleazar is not represented as a central authority in the formulation of the larger conceptions which underlie the law, nor do his traditions set the agenda of the law. Zahavy concludes that, "What we know of Eleazar thus is limited to the data that a few editors chose to preserve for the direct needs of their compilations. We have only brief glimpses of the whole tradition and the man. The thought and life of Eleazar remains... for the most part unknowable."

However, see Eleazar ben Azariah's far-reaching comments preserved for later generations at B.T., Hagigah 3b, which explicitly present an underlying rationale and agenda for the entirety of the Oral Torah discussions of the Talmudic and later Sages. He says there that those that argue that something is impure and those that say it is pure, those who prohibit something and those who permit it, those who disqualify and those who declare (the same thing) fit, all are right in their way, "as is written, 'And God spoke all these words.'" That is, if one has a "discerning heart" one can grasp how both yea and nay can faithfully transmit HaShem's will and be true. The key thing is therefore for the Sage to sincerely work through his own understanding of a given question, thinking it out as fully as possible, and then to present it to the other Sages for them to evaluate, change, add to, or reject: it is not for the sake of being right or to dominate, but for the sake of Heaven just to clarify the issues, and then to trust to the other Sages to deliver a final assestment on behalf of Torah from Sinai. In this way the consensus of the Sages expresses God's will (also see the overlapping text in 3a to 3b).

== Jewish Encyclopedia bibliography ==
- Bacher, Ag. Tan. i. 219 et seq.;
- Brüll, Mebo ha-Mishnah, i. 88 et seq.;
- Frankel, Darke ha-Mishnah, pp. 91 et seq.;
- Grätz, Gesch. 2d ed., iv. 37 et seq.;
- Hamburger, R. B. T. ii. 156 et seq.;
- Heilprin, Seder ha-Dorot, ii., s.v.;
- Weiss, Dor, ii. 94 et seq.;
- Zacuto, Yuḥasin, ed. Filipowski, pp. 39b et seq.
