= Gamaliel II =

Judean rabbi and nasi from c. 80 to c. 118

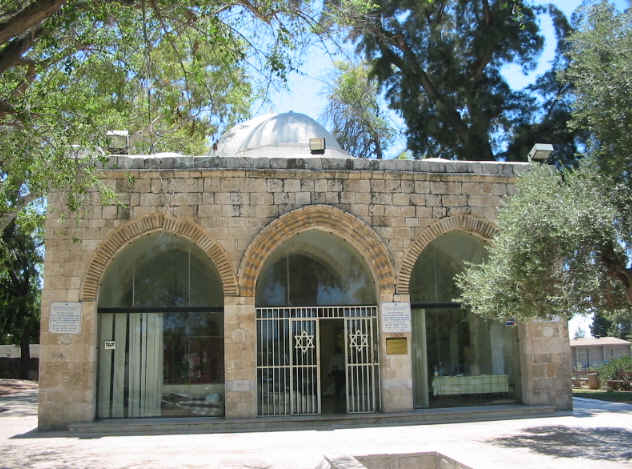
Tomb attributed to Rabban Gamliel in Yavneh, also known as the Mausoleum of Abu Huraira. A Hebrew travel guide dated between 1266 and 1291 mentioned the tomb as being used as a Muslim prayer house

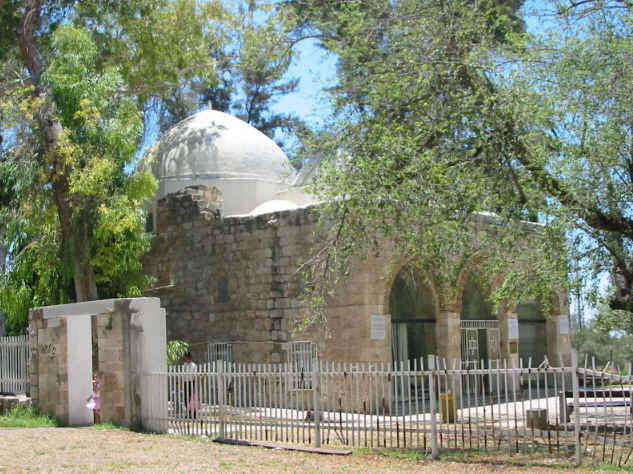
Another view of the tomb in Yavneh

Rabban Gamaliel II (also spelled Gamliel; Hebrew: רבן גמליאל דיבנה; before c. 80–c. 118) was a rabbi from the second generation of tannaim. He was the first person to lead the Sanhedrin as nasi after the fall of the Second Temple in 70 CE.

He was the son of Shimon ben Gamaliel, one of Jerusalem's foremost men in the war against the Romans, and grandson of Gamaliel I. To distinguish him from the latter he is also called Gamliel of Yavne.

== Biography ==
He seemed to have settled initially in Kefar 'Othnai in Lower Galilee, but with the outbreak of the war with Rome, he fled to Jerusalem. From there, he moved to Yavne. In Yavne, during the siege of Jerusalem, the scribes of the school of Hillel had taken refuge by permission of Vespasian, and a new centre of Judaism arose under the leadership of the aged Johanan ben Zakkai, a school whose members inherited the authority of the Sanhedrin of Jerusalem. He was appointed nasi in approximately the year 80 CE.

=== Leadership ===
Gamaliel II became Johanan ben Zakkai's successor, and rendered immense service in the strengthening and reintegration of Judaism, which had been deprived of its former basis by the destruction of the Second Temple and by the entire loss of its political autonomy. He put an end to the division which had arisen between the spiritual leaders of Judaism by the separation of the scribes into the two schools called respectively after Hillel and Shammai, and took care to enforce his own authority as the president of the chief legal assembly of Judaism with energy and often with severity. He did this, as he himself said, not for his own honor nor for that of his family, but in order that disunion should not prevail in Israel.

Gamaliel's position was recognized by the Roman government also, and he journeyed to Syria for the purpose of being confirmed in office by the governor. Towards the end of Domitian's reign (c. 95 CE), he went to Rome in company with the most prominent members of the school of Yavneh, in order to avert a danger threatening the Jews from the action of the emperor. Many interesting particulars have been given regarding the journey of these learned men to Rome and their sojourn there. The impression made by the capital of the world upon Gamaliel and his companions was an overpowering one, and they wept when they thought of Jerusalem in ruins.

Gamaliel sought to maintain ties with the diaspora by visiting communities abroad and welcoming visitors to Yavneh for study and consultation.

In Rome, as at home, Gamaliel often had occasion to defend Judaism in polemical discussions with pagans, and also with professed Christians.

He may have been the first to receive the title "nasi" (prince; later replaced by "patriarch"), given to raise him in public estimation and to revive the Biblical designation for the head of the nation. This title later became hereditary with his descendants.

=== Leadership controversy ===
Gamaliel was a controversial leader. In a dispute about fixing the calendar, Rabban Gamaliel humiliated Rabbi Joshua ben Hananiah by asking him to show up with his "stick and satchel" (weekday attire) on the holy day which according to Rabbi Joshua's calculation was Yom Kippur. Later on, another dispute broke out regarding the status of the nightly prayer, and he humiliated him again by asking him to stand up, and to remain standing while teaching his students. This incident shocked the Rabbis, and subsequently is said to have led to a rabbinic revolt against Gamaliel's leadership of the Sanhedrin. The Sanhedrin installed Rabbi Eleazar Ben Azariah as the new Nasi. After reconciling with Rabbi Joshua, Rabban Gamaliel was reinstated as Nasi, with Rabbi Eleazar serving along with him in a rotation every third week. According to the version recorded in the Jerusalem Talmud, Rabbi Eleazar served as Av Beit Din, a viceregent. Gamaliel, however, showed that with him it was only a question of principle, and that he had no intention of humiliating Joshua; for, rising and kissing him on the head, he greeted him with the words: "Welcome, my master and my pupil: my master in learning; my pupil in that you submit to my will."

Similarly, he was implicated in the 'excommunication' of his own brother-in-law, Eliezer ben Hyrcanus. His goal was to strengthen the authority of the assembly at Yavneh as well as his own authority, and thus brought upon himself the suspicion of seeking his own glory. However, Gamaliel describes his motivations in this episode as in the following prayer: "Lord of the world, it is manifest and known to Thee that I have not done it for my own honor nor for that of my house, but for Thy honor, that factions may not increase in Israel." A story which confirms Gamaliel's claim to modesty is told, in which he, standing, served his guests himself at a feast.

Gamaliel's greatest achievement was ending of the opposition between the schools of Hillel and Shammai, which had survived even the destruction of the Temple. According to tradition, a voice from heaven was heard in Yavneh, declaring that although the views of both schools were justifiable in principle (as "words of the living God"), in practice the views of Hillel's school are authoritative.

=== Anecdotes ===
Many of Gamaliel's decisions in religious law are connected with his stay in some place in the Holy Land. In Ecdippa the archisynagogue Scipio asked him a question which he answered by letter after his return home. There are also records of Gamaliel's stay in Kfar Uthnai, in Emmaus, in Lod, in Jericho in Samaria, and in Tiberias.

He was on friendly terms with many non-Jews, and was so warmly devoted to his slave Tavi that when Tavi died he mourned for him as for a beloved member of his own family. A friendly conversation is recorded which he had with a heathen on the way from Acre to Ecdippa. On the Sabbath he sat upon the benches of heathen merchants.

Still, Gamaliel and his sister, Ima Shalom, chided with the growing local Christian population, even mocking a certain gentile judge who had adjudicated in an inheritance case, in which Ima Shalom had made herself the make-believe claimant in the case. When the judge at first ruled in favor of the woman, he quickly rescinded the verdict in favor of Gamaliel after being given a bribe by Rabban Gamaliel. The story includes a reference to the words of Jesus in Matthew 5:17, with one possible reading of the story indicating that it was Gamaliel making this reference. This episode, as also another described elsewhere, are some of the first encounters with Christianity, during which Rabban Gamliel debated the "min," or philosopher, who maliciously concluded from Hosea 5:6 that God had completely forsaken Israel.

The memory of the destroyed Temple was especially vivid in Gamaliel's heart. Gamaliel and his companions wept over the destruction of Jerusalem and of the Temple when they heard the noise of the great city of Rome, and at another time when they stood on the Temple ruins.

=== Death ===
Gamaliel died around c. 118, which was before the insurrections under Trajan had brought fresh unrest into Israel. At his funeral the celebrated proselyte Aquila, reviving an ancient custom for the burial of kings, burned costly materials to the value of seventy minae.

Gamaliel himself had directed that his body be wrapped in the simplest possible shroud. By this he wished to check the extravagance which had become associated with funerals, and his end was attained; his example became the rule.

Of Gamaliel's children, one daughter is known, who answered in a very intelligent fashion two questions addressed to her father by a Gentile. Two of Gamaliel's sons are mentioned as returning from a certain feast.

One son, Simon, inherited his office long after his father's death, and after the Hadrianic persecutions, which thenceforward his descendants handed on from father to son.

It cannot be regarded as proved that the tanna Haninah ben Gamaliel was a son of Gamaliel II; this is more likely to be true of Judah ben Gamaliel, who reports a decision in the name of Haninah ben Gamaliel.

== Teachings ==
=== Halacha ===
Aside from his official position, Gamaliel stood in learning on an equal footing with the legal teachers of his time. Many of his halakhic opinions have been handed down. Sometimes the united opinion of Gamaliel and Eliezer ben Hyrcanus is opposed to that of Joshua ben Hananiah and sometimes Gamaliel holds a middle position between the stricter opinion of the one and the more lenient view of the other. Gamaliel assented to certain principles of civil law which have been transmitted in the name of Admon, a former judge in Jerusalem, and which became especially well known and were authoritative for ensuing periods.

Various details have been handed down by tradition concerning the religious practises of Gamaliel and his house. In Gamaliel's house it was not customary to say "Marpe'!" (Recovery) when any one sneezed, because that was a heathenish superstition. Two concessions were made to Gamaliel's household in the way of relaxing the severity of the rules set up as a barrier against heathendom: permission to use a mirror in cutting the hair of the head, and to learn Greek. In regard to the latter, Gamaliel's son Simon relates that many children were instructed in his father's house in "Greek wisdom."

He directed Simeon ha-Pakoli to edit the Amidah and make it a duty, incumbent on every one, to recite the prayer three times daily. Also, he directed Samuel ha-Katan to write another paragraph against informers and heretics.

Another liturgical institution goes back to Gamaliel—that of the memorial celebration which takes the place of the sacrifice of the Passover lamb on the first evening of Passover. Gamaliel instituted this celebration, which may be regarded as the central feature of the Passover Haggadah, on an occasion when he spent the first Passover night with other scholars at Lydda in conversing about the feast and its customs.

=== Aggadah ===
Gamaliel uses striking comparisons in extolling the value of handiwork and labor and in expressing his opinion on the proper training of the mind.

Gamaliel's appreciation of the virtue of mercy is well illustrated by a saying of his in allusion to Deuteronomy 13:18: "Let this be a token unto thee! So long as thou thyself art compassionate God will show thee mercy; but if thou hast no compassion, God will show thee no mercy".

Gamaliel II portrays the distress and corruption of the times in a remarkable speech which concludes with an evident reference to the emperor Domitian. He says: "Since lying judges have the upper hand, lying witnesses also gain ground; since evil-doers have increased, the seekers of revenge are also increasing; since shamelessness has augmented, men have lost their dignity; since the small says to the great. 'I am greater than thou,' the years of men are shortened; since the beloved children have angered their Father in heaven, He has placed a ruthless king over them [with reference to Job 34:20]. Such a king was Ahasuerus, who first killed his wife for the sake of his friend, and then his friend for the sake of his wife".

He loved discussing the sense of single portions of the Bible with other scholars, and made many fine expositions of the text. There are records of four such discussions, which all end with Gamaliel's expressed desire to hear the opinion of the eminent aggadist Eleazar of Modi'im.

The lament over his favorite pupil, Samuel haKatan, which he made in common with Eleazar b. Azariah, is very touching: "It is fitting to weep for him; it is fitting to lament for him. Kings die and leave their crowns to their sons; the rich die and leave their wealth to their sons; but Samuel haKaton has taken with him the most precious thing in the world—his wisdom—and is departed".

The Roman yoke borne by the Jewish people of Palestine weighed heavily upon Gamaliel. In one speech he portrays the tyranny of Rome that devours the property of its subjects. He reflects on the coming of the Messiah, and describes the period which shall precede His appearance as one of the deepest moral degradation and direst distress. But he preaches also of the fruitfulness and blessing which shall at some time distinguish the land of Israel.

Preceded by Yohanan ben Zakkai	Nasi ca. 80 – ca. 118	Succeeded by Shimon ben Gamliel II
