= Dosa ben Harkinas =

1st century CE Jewish Tanna sage

Dosa ben Harkinas (Hebrew: רבי דוסא בן הרכינס) was of the first generation of the Jewish Tanna sages, proceeding from the era of the Zugot. Contemporary to Yochanan ben Zakai, he was active during the era of the Second Temple of Jerusalem, and lived to an old age, even after the destruction of the Second Temple. He died approximately 60 years after the destruction of the temple.

The Babylonian Talmud relates a story attributed to Rabbi Dosa ben Harkinas and how that he had received an oral teaching passed down from Haggai the prophet, who had said three things: (a) that it is not lawful for a man whose brother married his daughter (as a co-wife in a polygamous relationship) to consummate a levirate marriage with one of his deceased brother's co-wives (a teaching accepted by the School of Hillel, and rejected by the School of Shammai); (b) that Jews living in the regions of Ammon and Moab separate from their produce the poor man's tithe during the Sabbatical year; (c) that they accept of proselytes from the peoples of Tadmor (Palmyra) and from the people of Ḳardu (Corduene).

In the days of Rabbi Dosa ben Harkinas, the general practice was as the teachings of the School of Hillel who prohibited a man of like status to consummate a levirate marriage with one of the co-wives of his daughter. The rabbis had heard that Rabbi Dosa ben Harkinas permitted it. They, therefore, came to question Rabbi Dosa's beliefs in this regard when it was reported in "Ben Harkinas' name" that he permitted such marriages. As it turned out, he explained that it was not him who permitted it, but rather his brother, Yonathan, who followed the teachings of the School of Shammai.

According to the Talmud (in the section Pirkei Avot) he said:

"Late morning sleep, midday wine, children's chatter, and sitting in the assemblies of the ignorant, remove a man from this world".

— Pirkei Avot, 3:14
