= Menahem the Essene =

Jewish Tanna sage living during the era of the Zugot

Menahem the Essene (Hebrew: מנחם) was a Jewish tanna sage living during the era of the Zugot (lit. "pairs"). As such, he was "paired" with Hillel the Elder and served as Av Beit Din. The Mishnah states he "went forth [out]", and as a result of that he was replaced by Shammai, who became from that point on the zug of Hillel. He was a contemporary of Herod the Great.

== Talmuds ==
The Babylonian Talmud cites a dispute amongst the sages over whence Menahem "went forth [out]". Abaye argues that "He went forth [out] into evil courses [culture]", while Rava argues "He went forth [out] to the King's service". The Talmud then quotes a baraita supporting Rava's opinion: "Thus it is also taught: Menahem went forth [out] to the King's service, and there went forth [out] with him eighty pairs of disciples dressed in silk [regally]".

The Jerusalem Talmud cites an additional opinion, that Menahem agreed to be appointed to a ministration position in order to revoke governmental predestinations against Torah studying.

== Josephus ==
The "Menahem" recorded in the Mishnah is thought to be the same as the one recounted in Josephus' Antiquities of the Jews, in which a story is told about a Menahem of the Essenes' sect.

According to Josephus, when Menahem saw a young Herod the Great going to school, he clapped him on the back and addressed him as king, announcing to him that he would reign successfully, despite Herod not being in the line of the royal dynasty. When Herod became king, he asked Menahem how long his reign would be. Initially, Menahem did not reply, and Herod urged him "Would my reign last ten years?". Menahem replied that Herod would reign at least 30 years but did not specify the exact number. Herod was pleased with Menahem's answer and dismissed him with a clasp of the hand and thenceforth bestowed special honors upon the Essenes.

Preceded by Abtalion	Av Beit Din	Succeeded by Shammai
