= Legend of Destruction =

2021 Israeli film about the Siege of Jerusalem and destruction of the 2nd Temple

- Directed by: Gidi Dar
- Written by: Gidi Dar; Shuli Rand
- Based on: Josephus' The Jewish War, Chazal sources and Talmudic Legends of Destruction
- Produced by: Gidi Dar; Amir Harel; Ayelet Kait; Yaki Dunietz
- Starring: Oscar Isaac; Evangeline Lilly; Billy Zane; Elliott Gould; Marilu Henner; Yigal Naor, in Hebrew
- Edited by: Joseph Greenfeld; Uri Ben Dov
- Music by: Assaf Talmudi; Yonatan Albalak
- Animation by: David Polonski; Michael Faust
- Production companies: Eddie King Films; Lama Films; LOD Productions
- Distributed by: Seventh Art Releasing; Nakhshon Films; HOT8; Kan 11
- Release dates: July 15, 2021 (Israel); June 4, 2024 (United States)
- Running time: 93 minutes
- Countries: United States; Israel
- Language: English

Legend of Destruction (Hebrew: אגדת חורבן, romanized: Agadat Khurban) is a 2021 animated historical drama film, directed by director Gidi Dar, who wrote the screenplay in collaboration with Shuli Rand. It is an interpretation of Talmudic stories of the destruction of Jerusalem and the Second Temple in 70 CE.

In 2023, a new English version was finalized, after it was recorded in the US, with voice acting by Oscar Isaac, Elliott Gould, Evangeline Lilly, Billy Zane and Marilu Henner, among others.

June 4, 2024, was the date of the world premiere of the film at the Israel Film Center Festival in Manhattan, New York City.

The plot is a historical epic, described through the perspective of six historical figures in Roman-controlled Judaea during the late Second Temple period, and is based on historical sources such as the Talmud and Josephus' The Jewish War, which tells the story of the Great Jewish Revolt against the Roman Empire. At the same time, Jewish society was torn apart by a bloody civil war that culminated in the destruction of Jerusalem and the Second Temple.

The Hebrew version of the film was released on 15 July 2021 in Israeli cinemas. It received 7 nominations for the Ophir Awards, and 4 wins for best editing, art direction, music, and sound. The film was aired on Kan 11 on February 20, 2022.

Actors Shuli Rand, Ze'ev Revach, Amos Tamam, Moni Moshonov, Yael Abukasis, and Yigal Naor voice the lead roles in the Hebrew. The film uses approximately 1,500 paintings, inspired by the depicted century, to animate the story.

== Plot ==
AD 66, Jerusalem. The Romans ruled Judaea with an iron fist and the sophistication worthy of the empire. They like the rich strata of society and corrupt them as a result. Even the high priests responsible for administering the Second Temple and its works are tainted with deep corruption. In contrast, the impoverishment and oppression of the Jewish masses incites many young people to join secret groups of religious zealots, becoming freedom fighters in the name of God. They not only despise the Roman conquerors, but also the wealthy Jews who cooperate with them in oppressing their own people. As tension builds underground, a small spark triggers a rebellion.

Ben Batich is a young Jew living in Jerusalem who feels the tax burden in the city and the Roman rule makes life unbearable. His uncle Rabban Yohanan ben Zakkai preaches for moderation, but the nephew rebels and becomes the leader of the fanatical Sicarii.

At the start of the revolt, Ben Batich collaborates with the warrior Shimon Bar Giora but their paths later diverge. After the fall of the Galilee to the Romans from the north, John of Gischala (Yigal Naor) arrives in Jerusalem to offer help. The rebels open the gates to him, but instead of uniting, the factions fight while the priests under Joshua ben Gamla slaughter and sacrifice sheep.

At the same time, the Jewish queen Berenice of Cilicia travels to the Galilee to seduce the Roman commander Titus, in hopes of saving Jerusalem.

As the Roman war machine approaches Judea to quell the revolt, Jerusalem is torn apart by bloody civil unrest: poor zealots slaughter the aristocracy non-stop and a zealous terrorist regime rules the city. Heavy street fights are waged by rival fanatical gangs, and one battle ends with the burning of food silos in Jerusalem. A terrible famine breaks out. Gangs roam the city robbing the hungry residents of their last loaves of bread. Life in Jerusalem is a total hell.

Only after the Romans surround the city, the Jewish fanatics finally unite against their common enemy. Their seemingly impossible situation transcends them to a deep spiritual state in which they lose all fear of death. They attack the Romans with daring suicide attacks. For a moment the Jews appear to gain the upper hand, but the Romans soon recover, break down the city’s walls, slaughter thousands and destroy the Temple.

== Voice cast of English version ==
- Oscar Isaac - Ben Batich
- Elliott Gould - Rabban Yohanan ben Zakkai
- Evangeline Lilly - Queen Berenice
- Billy Zane - Simon bar Giora
- Marilu Henner - Mother of Ben Batich and sister of Rabban Yohanan ben Zakkai

== Voice cast of Hebrew version ==
- Shuli Rand - Ben Batich
- Ze'ev Revach - The High Priest Joshua ben Gamla
- Moni Moshonov - Rabban Yohanan ben Zakkai
- Amos Tamam - Simon bar Giora
- Yigal Naor - John of Gischala
- Yael Abukasis - Queen Berenice
- Rita Shukron - Mother of Ben Batich and sister of Rabban Yohanan ben Zakkai
- Uria Khaik - General Titus (future Roman emperor)

== Production ==
The Hebrew version of the film was produced by Lama Films and Eddie King Films, with the assistance of the Yehoshua Rabinovich Foundation for the Arts – Cinema Project; Yaki Donitz Productions; The Jerusalem Film and Television Project; Gesher Multicultural Film Fund; Avi Chai; the Maimonides Fund; Channels HOT8 and Kan 11 under the Israeli Broadcasting Corporation; Israel Lottery Council for Culture & Arts; and the Cultural Administration and the Israeli Film Council belonging to the Israeli Ministry of Culture and Sport. The English version was produced by LOD Productions.

=== The drawing process ===
The film is not produced using traditional animation techniques, but by editing about 1,500 still paintings illustrated by David Polonsky and Michael Faust, described as a "painted movie".

About eight years were spent developing and producing the film, including three and a half years of concept development, initial sketches and storyboarding, followed by four and a half years of producing the illustrations. Polonsky and Faust reviewed books, visited the Temple Institute in Jerusalem, and used the model of Jerusalem from the Israel Museum to accurately depict Jewish life during this period.

The paintings ranged in style from a detailed realism reminiscent of Neoclassicism to a more free-form expressionist aesthetic. Some of the illustrations were influences by famous 20th century paintings, some were inspired by well-known people from real life, while others were based on photos that the artists posed for themselves.

The project began their exploration with the realistic funerary portraits from the Egyptian city of Fayum, dating back to the first century. These portraits, originally painted to cover the faces of mummified bodies, crafting the film’s characters. As co-director Faust noted, "Because these are tomb paintings, they kept them very realistic, which was not necessarily the style of the time". Yet some characters, like Ben Batich, the leader of the Jewish Zealots voiced by Oscar Isaac, remained elusive. His likeness emerged unexpectedly, inspired by a chance encounter in a Tel Aviv basement hummus bar, where an Iranian-Jewish mother and her son unwittingly became visual models for the character. "We ran back to the studio and did sketches", the filmmakers said.

For a celebratory scene hosted by Queen Berenice, the directors leaned into the lush, decorative aesthetic of 19th-century painter Lawrence Alma-Tadema, whose romanticized visions of antiquity added a deliberate layer of kitsch and opulence. The death of ben Zakkai is staged using the exact composition of Edvard Munch’s 1896 painting By The Death Bed, while a gruesome Roman massacre draws from the distorted, tortured faces seen in Francis Bacon’s work, channeling chaos and psychological horror through expressionist brushwork.

Historical art references were used in the film. A climactic speech by a Judean rebel leader is staged as a direct homage to Sergei Eisenstein’s Battleship Potemkin (1925), reflecting the silent film era’s use of visual geometry and mass emotion. Renaissance portraiture and mid-20th-century photojournalism were also key influences.

== Reception ==
The film received rave reviews. For example, Gili Izikowitz wrote "Director Gidi Der took the most threatening Jewish myth that exists, that of the destruction of the house due to a fratricidal war, and at a particularly poignant time turned it into a beautiful and unusual cinematic epic." Critics argued that the film was also relevant to the period in which it was released (2021), emphasizing the pragmatic approach and the problematic nature of the influx of extremist ideologies, which was also reflected in the protests that took place in Israel during the Wall Guard operation in the Gaza Strip and in protest against the legal reform during the 37th Israeli government. The film also finds new resonance after October 7

Moshe Ret wrote that the character of God in the film is indifferent to the fate of the people. The message that the film emphasizes at the end is the importance of unity and tolerance..

Rabbi Yaakov Madan claimed that the character of Rabbi Yohanan ben Zakhai is presented in the film in an inadequate way, as a man who, under the pressure of circumstances, chooses to bury his head in the sand, loose and lacking in real influence. Rabbi Yohanan is also presented as someone who was satisfied with the statement "the Torah saves and protects" and therefore there is no need to fight, while Ben Zakhai amended regulations and was active even before the destruction.

Nir Guntaz claimed that the film is an atheist manifesto as it shows that religious belief destroyed Jerusalem. Rabbi Michael Avraham learned from this that everyone chooses to interpret the film according to their own positions. Dafna Avraham claimed that her impression from the film was that the destruction was a good solution to the situation: the people got rid of the corrupt government and the Torah continued in Yavneh . IAvraham Stav wrote similar things.

The Telegraph underscored the film’s visual ambition "It does so in an innovative, beautiful way". The article mentions Dar's argument, claiming the film is excluded from festivals for being perceived as “too Jewish”, and that international festival circuits are shaped by a “woke” bias that often demands overly critical portrayals of Israel to be acceptable.

=== Credibility ===
The film is not meant to be a clear, completely accurate historical depiction of the years leading up to the destruction of the Jewish Temple. For example, the character of Ben Batich appears only in the Legends of the Talmud and not in Josephus' book The War of the Jews. Also, the story of Rabban ben Zakkai's meeting with Vespasian appears in the film with changes. Dar did extensive research with various historians and religious sources and based his film on his research, including the work of the historian Flavius Josephus —né Yosef ben Matityahu, and commonly known as Josephus — Talmudic stories, and other sources. Dar called the film Legend of Destruction to echo the Talmudic legends. Michael Ben Ari claimed that the director presents a certain narrative that is influenced by the books of Josephus, who is not considered to have an objective opinion and does not reflect the historical truth due to his betrayal of the Jewish people.

== See also ==
- Second Temple
- Siege of Jerusalem (70 CE)
