= Tavi (slave) =

Tavi (Hebrew: טָבִי; fl. 1st century) was the slave of Gamaliel II. Although a convert to Judaism, he was known for his acquaintance and adherence to Talmudic law and for his piety.

Tavi is mentioned in several instances in the Mishnah. During the Feast of Tabernacles, he used to sleep under the bed in the sukkah. In allusion to this habit Gamaliel observed, "Tavi, my slave, is a scholar; he knows that the law of booths does not apply to slaves, and therefore he sleeps under the bed". Yet Tavi used to wear Tefillin, a duty and privilege of free men; but, his piety being known, he was not interfered with. Wishing to free him, but unable to do so since it would be contrary to the Law, Gamaliel, ostensibly by accident, put out one of his slave's eyes; then, meeting R. Joshua, he expressed his great joy at having found occasion to free his slave. Joshua, however, told him that he was mistaken, since no witnesses had been present and since he had confessed to the act himself. When Tavi died, his master received condolences from his friends, a rare occurrence in the case of slaves.

It is said in Menahem Azariah da Fano's Gilgule Neshamot that Gamaliel's soul emanated from that of Shem, while Tavi's soul emanated from that of Ham, who was, according to the Bible, destined to be a slave to his brother. Besides, according to the lesser numerical values of the letters of the Hebrew alphabet, the names of Ham and Tavi both have the same numerical value, namely, twelve.
