= Eleazar bar Zadok =

- אלעזר בר צדוק
- Title: Rabbi

Personal life
- Parent: Rabbi Zadok (father)
- Known for: Mentioned in the Mishna
- Other names: Elazar Berabi Zadok

Religious life
- Religion: Judaism
- Profession: Shopkeeper in Jerusalem

Senior posting
- Teacher: Rabbi Yochanan HaHorani, Rabban Gamliel
- Period in office: Tannaim

Eleazar bar Zadok (Hebrew: אלעזר בר צדוק), or Elazar Berabi Zadok, was a rabbi from the period of the Tannaim, who is mentioned many times in the Mishna. He was the son of Rabbi Zadok.

== Biography ==
His life story is obscure, to the point that scholar Aharon Hyman wrote "Regarding the events of this tanna's life, much confusion has arisen, to the point that even if we say that [the lives of] two people are [recorded in his name], we will not solve all difficulties." Hyman then performed an exhaustive investigation, concluding that seven generations of Torah scholars from one family appear in the Mishna, three of them named "Rabbi Tzadok" and three named "Rabbi Eleazar bar Zadok". Of the three named Eleazar, the first was the son of "Tzadok" (in his lifetime the title "Rabbi" was not popular, but he was occasionally known after his death as "Rabbi Tzadok"), and was the student of Rabbi Yochanan HaHorani, and worked as a shopkeeper in Jerusalem all his life, together with Abba Shaul ben Bitnit. The second Eleazar was son of the well-known Rabbi Zadok, and this Rabbi Eleazar provided the well-known testimonies from the house of Rabban Gamliel and was considered one of Rabban Gamliel's greatest students. The third Eleazar - son of the third Rabbi Tzadok - was the student of Rabbi Meir.

== In Rabban Gamliel's house ==
Rabbi Tzadok and his son Rabbi Eleazar were close to Rabban Gamliel, and frequently visited him. For example, R' Eleazar stated "Many times I entered after my father to the house of Rabban Gamliel, and they did not sweep the room of the beds on Yom Tov, but rather, they would sweep them on the eve of Yom Tov, and stretch sheets over them; the next day when guests arrived they would remove the sheets, and thus the house was swept on its own." Similarly, R' Eleazar stated, Rabban Gamliel found a way to circumvent the prohibition on placing incense on coals on Yom Tov, by placing incense on coals in a closed container before Yom Tov, and opening the container on Yom Tov, causing the aroma to spread through the house.

== Priesthood ==
Several sources suggest that R' Eleazar and his family were of priestly descent, though one source suggests that they were from the tribe of Benjamin. To resolve this discrepancy, Tosafot suggested that R' Eleazar's father was a priest and his mother a Benjaminite.
