= Nahal Seter =

Stream in Upper Galilee region of Israel

Coordinates: 32°56′25″N 35°28′25″E

Location
- State: Israel
- Region: Upper Galilee

Nahal Seter (Hebrew: נחל סתר) is one of the tributaries of Nahal Amud in the Upper Galilee. Its length is approximately one and a half kilometers.

Nahal Seter begins at an elevation of about 620 metres (2,030 ft) above sea level, between Mount Mitzpe Hayamim, north of moshav Amirim, and Kfar Shamai. The stream is relatively short at 1.5 kilometres (0.93 mi) and is very steep, with an average gradient of 30%. In the area where Nahal Seter joins Nahal Amud, there is a spring called Ein Seter, which mainly flows during a rainy winter.
