= Abba Sakkara =

Zealot leader during the First Jewish Revolt according to Talmudic legends

Abba Sakkara (alternatively written as Abba Sikra and Abba Sikkara, Aramaic: אבא סקרא, lit. "father of the Sicarii"), was a 1st-century leader of the Jewish Zealots, who had revolted against the Romans in Jerusalem during the first Jewish-Roman war. He is understood to be the same person known as Ben Batiach (Hebrew: בן בטיח) mentioned in the midrashic commentaries Lamentations Rabbah and Ecclesiastes Rabbah.

== Biography ==
According to the Talmudic account, Abba Sakkara was the son of Johanan ben Zakkai's sister, and had a prominent role in the rebellion against Rome as the head of the Zealots at Jerusalem, responsible for burning the city's granaries in order to cause a famine that would force the Jerusalemites to fight against the Romans. After the Zealots had destroyed all storehouses, ben Zakkai summoned his nephew to meet him in secret and arrange for his escape from the city, so he could negotiate with Vespasian. They managed this by pretending ben Zakkai had suddenly fallen ill and died, passing him through the city gates which were guarded by the Zealots, to be buried. At the city entrance Abba Sakkra dissuaded the guards from stabbing the corpse to make sure it was dead by telling them that if they do so the Romans would say that they (the Zealots) stab even their own Rabbis.

Johanan ben Zakkai later negotiated with Vespasian, then a military commander and later Roman Emperor, to permit him to settle in Yavne and teach his disciples there. After Jerusalem and its Temple were destroyed as a result of the failure of the revolt in 70 CE, with most of its population dead, ben Zakkai's Yavne school functioned as the new seat of the reestablished Sanhedrin. This is seen as a major step in the development of Second Temple Judaism into Rabbinic Judaism, which was crucial to the survival of the Jewish nation as a whole, finding themselves suddenly without a political or spiritual center in a post-Temple world.

== In popular culture ==
Abba Sakkara is portrayed in the 2021 Israeli animated film Legend of Destruction as Ben Batikh, the young nephew of Rabbi Johanan Ben Zakakai who becomes the leader of the fanatical Sicarii during the Great Jewish Revolt in 66AD Judaea.
