= Joshua ben Hananiah =

Late 1st/early 2nd century Jewish tanna and sage

Joshua ben Hananiah (Hebrew: יהושע בן חנניה Yəhōšūaʿ ben Ḥănanyā; d. 131 CE), also known as Rabbi Yehoshua, was a leading tanna of the first half-century following the destruction of the Second Temple. He is the eighth-most-frequently mentioned sage in the Mishnah.

== Biography ==
He was of Levitical descent, and served in the sanctuary as a member of the class of singers. His mother intended him for a life of study, and, as an older contemporary, Dosa ben Harkinas, relates, she carried the child in his cradle into the synagogue, so that his ears might become accustomed to the sounds of the words of the Torah. It was probably with reference to his pious mother that Yohanan ben Zakkai thus expressed himself concerning Joshua ben Hananiah: "Hail to thee who gave him birth". According to another tradition Yohanan ben Zakkai praised him in the words of Ecclesiastes (4:12), "And a threefold cord is not quickly broken." Perhaps he meant that in Joshua the three branches of traditional learning, Midrash, Halakha, and Aggadah, were united in a firm whole; or possibly he used the passage in the sense in which it was employed later, to show that Joshua belonged to a family of scholars even to the third generation.

Joshua's permanent residence was in Peki'in, a place between Yavne and Lydda, where he followed the trade of a needle-maker. This occupation did not in any degree diminish the respect paid to him as one of the influential members of the academy at Yavne.

Joshua ben Hananiah was one of the five who formed the inner circle of Yohanan's pupils. In enumerating them, tradition places him at the head together with Eliezer ben Hurcanus. Tradition also frequently mentions these two together as upholders of opposite views. They were both present at the celebration of the circumcision of Elisha ben Abuyah (Acher), in Jerusalem, and diverted themselves by connecting passages in the Torah with others in the Prophets and the Hagiographa. It was also Eliezer and Joshua who rescued Yohanan ben Zakkai from the besieged city and brought him into the camp of Vespasian.

After the death of Yohanan ben Zakkai c. 80 CE, Joshua was the heartiest supporter of Gamaliel II's efforts to bring about the predominance of the views of Hillel the Elder's followers over those of Shammai's, and thus to end the discord which had so long existed between the schools. But he was the very one whom Gamaliel humiliated on a certain occasion when the authority of the president was in question. Joshua's pliant disposition did not shield him from humiliation by Gamaliel a second time, and the wrong done to Joshua was the cause of Gamaliel's removal from office. He soon obtained Joshua's forgiveness, and this opened the way for his reinstatement; but he was now obliged to share his office with Eleazar ben Azariah, who had originally been appointed his successor.

Joshua esteemed Eleazar very highly, and on one occasion called out in his emphatic manner: "Hail to thee, Father Abraham, for Eleazar ben Azariah came forth from thy loins!" When it became necessary to present the case of the Palestinian Jews at Rome, the two presidents, Gamaliel and Eleazar, went as their representatives, and Joshua ben Hananiah and Akiva accompanied them. This journey of the "elders" to Rome, and their stay in the Imperial City, furnished material for many narratives. In one of these the Romans call on Joshua ben Hananiah to give proofs from the Bible of the resurrection of the dead and of the foreknowledge of God. In another, Joshua comes to the aid of Gamaliel when the latter is unable to answer the question of a "philosopher". In tractate Horayot, in an anecdote concerning a sea voyage undertaken by Gamaliel and Joshua, the astronomical knowledge of the latter is put to use. He is said to have calculated that a comet would appear in the course of the voyage.

After Gamaliel's death, the first place among the scholars fell to Joshua, since Eliezer ben Hyrcanus was under a ban. Joshua wished to do away with a regulation of Gamaliel's, but met with opposition on the part of the council. Joshua stood by the death-bed of his colleague Eliezer ben Hyrcanus and called to him: "O master, thou art of more value to Israel than God's gift of the rain; since the rain gives life in this world only, whereas thou givest life both in this world and in the world to come". When, after Eliezer's death, the other law scholars, Eleazar ben Azariah, Tarfon, and Akiva, contested some of his opinions, Joshua said to them: "One should not oppose a lion after he is dead". Eleazar, also, seems to have died some time before Joshua.

It is related that when Joshua ben Hananiah was about to die, the scholars standing round his bed mourned, saying: "How shall we maintain ourselves against the unbelievers?" Joshua comforted them with words from Jeremiah 49:7: "If counsel has been taken away from the children [of God, i.e. Israel], the wisdom of these [the enemy] has also perished".

After his death Joshua's importance was extolled in the words: "Since Rabbi Joshua died, good counsel has ceased in Israel." Not long after Joshua's death the thinkers were superseded by the men of action, and Simon bar Kokhba, enthusiastically greeted by Joshua's most influential pupil, Rabbi Akiva, raised the flag of rebellion against Rome. That this step had not been taken earlier was due to Joshua's influence.

=== Relations with non-Jews ===
In the beginning of Hadrian's rule, Joshua appears as a leader of the Jewish people. When the permission to rebuild the Temple was again refused, he turned the excited people from thoughts of revolt against Rome by a speech in which he skilfully made use of a fable of Aesop concerning the lion and the crane. About the same time, Joshua by his eloquence prevented the whole area of the Temple from being pronounced unclean because one human bone had been found in it.

Joshua lived to witness Hadrian's visit to Palestine, and he followed the emperor to Alexandria (130). The conversations between Joshua and Hadrian, as they have been preserved in the Babylonian Talmud (Hullin 59b) and the Palestinian Midrash, have been greatly modified and exaggerated by tradition, but they nevertheless present in general a just picture of the intercourse between the witty Jewish scholar and the active, inquisitive emperor, the "curiositatum omnium explorator", as Tertullian calls him.

In Palestinian sources Joshua answers various questions of the emperor: how God created the world, concerning the angels, as to the resurrection of the body, and with reference to the Decalogue. In the Babylonian Talmud, three conversations are related, which resemble that on the Decalogue, in that Joshua silences the emperor's mockery of the Jewish conception of God by proving to him God's incomparable greatness and majesty. Joshua also rebukes the emperor's daughter when she mocks at the God of the Jews; in another place she is made to repent for having mocked Joshua's appearance. The emperor's question concerning the odor of Sabbath food is a mocking one. Once, Joshua told the emperor that he would dream of the Parthians. At another time, he excused his own non-appearance at a meeting by cleverly describing the infirmities of his old age. In one conversation, preserved by a later authority, Joshua defended the justice of God, which was doubted by the emperor. Once a dispute in pantomime took place in the emperor's palace between Joshua and a Judeo-Christian ("Min"), in which Joshua maintained that God's protective hand was still stretched over Israel. In another conversation Joshua defended the honor of Israel against a heretic, who had attacked it, by quoting from Micah 7:4.

Some of the questions addressed to Joshua by the Athenian wise men, found in a long story in the Babylonian Talmud, contain polemical expressions concerning Christianity. The historical basis for this remarkable tradition is found in Hadrian's association with Joshua ben Hananiah, in Joshua's visit to Athens, and in his intercourse with Athenian scholars and philosophers. Its conclusion is an echo of the myth of the Danaïdes, and it is supposed to demonstrate the superiority of the "wise men of the Jews" over the "elders of Athens". Embodied in this tradition are the stories in which the wit of Athens is conquered by the cleverness of the men of Jerusalem. In one of these, the pupils of Yohanan ben Zakkai make sport of an Athenian. That the tradition contains in parts polemics against Christianity is explained by the fact that Joshua ben Hananiah fought the beliefs of the Judeo-Christians. The same spirit is manifested in the story concerning his nephew Hananiah.

== His exegesis ==
Joshua ben Hananiah's exegetical controversies with two of his most prominent contemporaries occupy an important place in the aggadic tradition. These two are his colleague Eliezer ben Hurcanus, who is frequently also mentioned in the Halakha as holding an opposite opinion, and Eleazar of Modi'im, who belonged to the school of Yavne and was especially known as the author of aggadic expositions of the Bible. The controversies between Eliezer and Joshua refer to cosmology, to eschatology, comprising views on the period as well as on the world to come and the resurrection, and to the interpretation of various Biblical passages.

The controversies between Joshua ben Hananiah and Eleazar of Modi'im are found in the Mekhilta on Exodus, and they form at the same time a continuous double commentary on the sections concerning the stay of the Israelites at Marah, the miracle of the manna, the fight with Amalek, and the visit of Jethro. In these controversies Joshua, as a rule, stands for the naturalistic, literal meaning of the words and the historical interpretation of the contents, putting emphasis on the meaning demanded by the context.

The Alexandrian Jews addressed twelve questions to Joshua. They fall into four groups:

1. three halakhic
2. three aggadic
3. three foolishly ignorant questions (a sort of parody on the questions of halakic casuistry)
4. three questions taken from practical life.

Eleven questions also were addressed to him concerning the special position of woman in physical, spiritual, social, and religious matters. Some of these with his answers are:

- "Why is a man easy, a woman difficult, to persuade?"

"Man was created out of earth, which easily dissolves in water; woman was created from bone, which is not affected by water."

- "Why does a man have his head uncovered while a woman has hers covered?"

"Whoever has committed a sin is ashamed before people; thus woman is ashamed on account of Eve's sin, and consequently covers her head."

- "Why do women take precedence in funeral processions?"

"Because they have brought death into the world."

== Opposition to asceticism ==
After the destruction of the Second Temple, Joshua opposed the exaggerated asceticism with which many wished to show their grief, e.g., in going without meat and wine because the altar on which they had sacrificed animals and poured libations of wine had been destroyed. He represented to them that to be consistent they ought to eat no figs or grapes, since no more first-fruits were offered, and that they ought even to refrain from bread and water, since the festival of drawing water (nisukh hammayim) had been discontinued, and the showbread as well as the two loaves of the feast of first-fruits could no longer be sacrificed. With such arguments Joshua supported the efforts of his teacher to make the grief at the loss of the Temple, which until then had been the center of religious life, less bitter.

One time, when Rabban Yochanan ben Zakai was walking in Jerusalem with Rebbi Yehoshua, they arrived at where the Temple in Jerusalem now stood in ruins. "Woe to us" cried Rabbi Yehoshua, "for this house where atonement was made for Israel's sins now lies in ruins!" Answered Rabban Yochanan, "We have another, equally important source of atonement, the practice of gemilut hasadim (loving kindness), as it is stated 'I desire loving kindness and not sacrifice.'

— Avot of Rabbi Natan

His opposition to asceticism, however, was due also to his mild and temperate nature, which caused him to say in regard to the severe regulations which had been adopted by the school of Shammai shortly before the destruction of the sanctuary: "On that day they overstepped the boundary." As he declared in a dispute on this subject with his colleague Eliezer ben Hurcanus, "they have poured water into a vessel full of oil, thus causing the costly oil to run to waste". Joshua saw the greatest danger to the community in the sickly offshoots of piety. The following he calls "enemies of general prosperity":

- the foolishly pious (pious at the wrong time)
- sly sinners
- the woman who shows an overpious bearing
- the hypocrites who pretend to be saints

In his motto of life he recommends temperance and the love of mankind as a security for individual happiness. An evil eye (grudging), evil inclination (passion), and hatred of mankind, he says, remove people from the world. In the same spirit he answers the question put by Yohanan ben Zakkai to his pupils as to the best standard of conduct. He declares that one should seek association with a good companion and avoid a bad one. Various anecdotes illustrate the opposition between Joshua, who represented the teachings of Hillel, and his colleague Eliezer, who represented the teachings of Shammai, much in the same way as the opposition between Hillel and Shammai is depicted elsewhere.

== Sayings ==
Joshua ben Hananiah was regarded by posterity as a man always ready with an answer, and as the victorious representative of Jewish wit and wisdom. This is shown in the accounts of his conversations with heathens and in other narratives. He himself tells of three encounters in which he had to yield the palm to the wit of a woman and a child. He introduces the story in these words: "No one ever overcame me except a woman, a boy, and a maid". Joshua explains the end of Psalms 9:18 to mean that there are even among the Gentiles pious people who will have a share in the life everlasting. "The Psalms", he also said, "do not refer to the personal affairs of David, but to the affairs of all Israel." If a man learns a halakhic sentence in the morning and two sentences in the evening, and he is busy the whole day at his trade, it will be accounted to him as though he had fulfilled the whole Torah. Holidays are intended to be employed half for worldly enjoyment, half for study. From Ruth 2:19 it may be concluded that the poor person who receives does more for the giver than the giver does for the recipient.

=== Other quotes ===
The evil eye and the evil inclination and hatred of one's fellow man put a man out of this world.

More than what the Good Man of the house does for the poor, the poor man does for the Good Man of the house.

There is no House of Study without its novellae.

== Burial place ==
Rabbi Chaim Vital (circa 1570) mentions for the first time in his book "Shaar HaGilgulim", in the name of Rabbi Yehoshua, the burial of Rabbi Yehoshua in the ancient Jewish cemetery in Safed:

"In the state of Safed, 1922 there is a Jewish cemetery with one house inside it, and a high circular dome building in the middle of its roof like a kind of a cave, and in the north of that house there is a small hole open to one cave, and in that cave the world says that Hosea ben Bari is buried there, and it is not, although it is Rabbi Yehoshua is buried there and he is Tana, and the people were mistaken and called him Hosea"

Other notable rabbis also buried in HaRambam compound / complex:

- Shelach HaKadosh
- Maimonides
- Eliezer ben Hurcanus
- Yohanan ben Zakkai

== Bibliography ==
- Bacher, Wilhelm. Die Agada der Tannaiten. Erster Band: Von Hillel bis Akiba (in German) 2nd ed. (Strassburg: Trübner, 1903), p. 123–187, 196–210
- Brüll, Jakob. Einleitung in die Mishna (Two parts, 1876/1885)
- Derenbourg, Joseph. Essai sur l'Histoire et le Géographie de la Palestine, d'après les Thalmuds et les autres sources rabbiniques. Première partie. Histoire de la Palestine depuis Cyrus jusqu'à Adrien (Paris, 1867)
- Frankel, Zacharias. Darke ha-Mishnah (1859; reprint: Tel Aviv: Sinai, 1959)
- Graetz, Heinrich. Geschichte der Juden von den ältesten Zeiten bis auf den Gegenwart, Vol. 4 (Vierte Band): Geschichte der Juden vom Untergang des jüdischen Staates bis zum Abschluss des Talmud (Berlin: Veit, 1853), p. 29-46
- Lewysohn, Abraham. Toledot R. Yehoshua' b. Hananiah, in Naphtali Keller's Bikkurim, vol. 1 (1864), p. 26–35
- Weiss, Isaac Hirsch. Dor-dor ve-dorshav, vol. 2 (1876)
