= Admon (tanna) =

Late 1st century CE chief dayan (religious judge) in Jerusalem

Admon (Hebrew: אדמון, or as cited in one of the Baraitas as: אדמון בן גדאי, "Admon ben Gaddai") was an Tanna, and chief dayan (religious judge) on the three police-court judges in Jerusalem during the latter end of the era of the Second Temple of Jerusalem and the times preceding the fall of Jerusalem, and during the times of the end of the era of the Zugot sages and the beginning of the era of the Tannaim. The Mishnah cites seven religious controversies he had with other Jewish sages. One of the Baraitas cites his full name: "Admon ben Gaddai".
