= Al-Sammu'i =

Al-Sammu'i السموعي Sammu'i
- Village
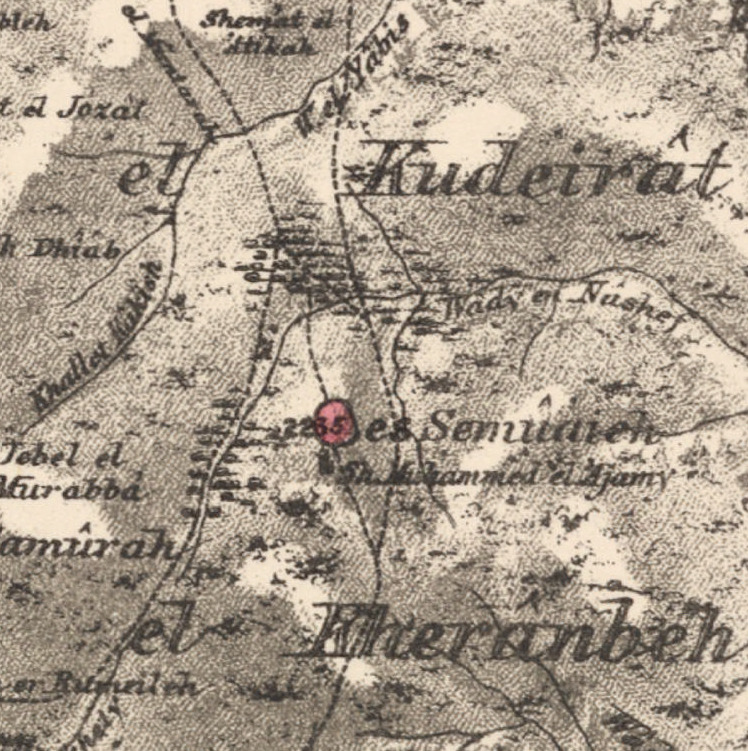
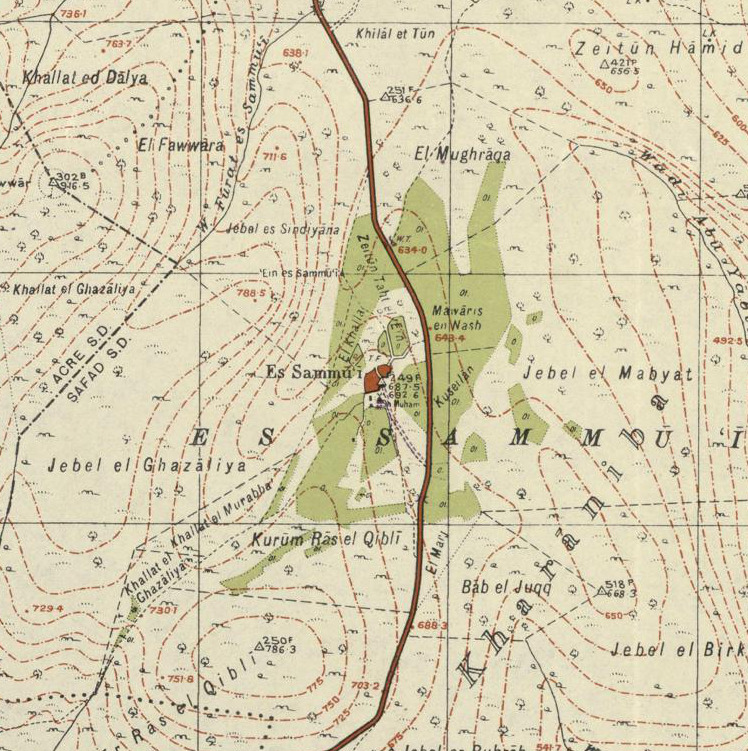
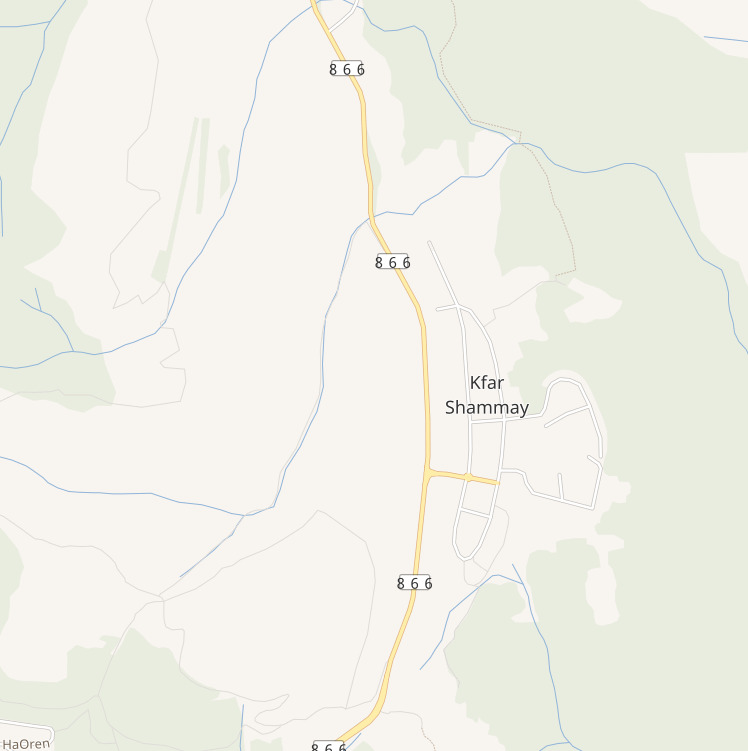
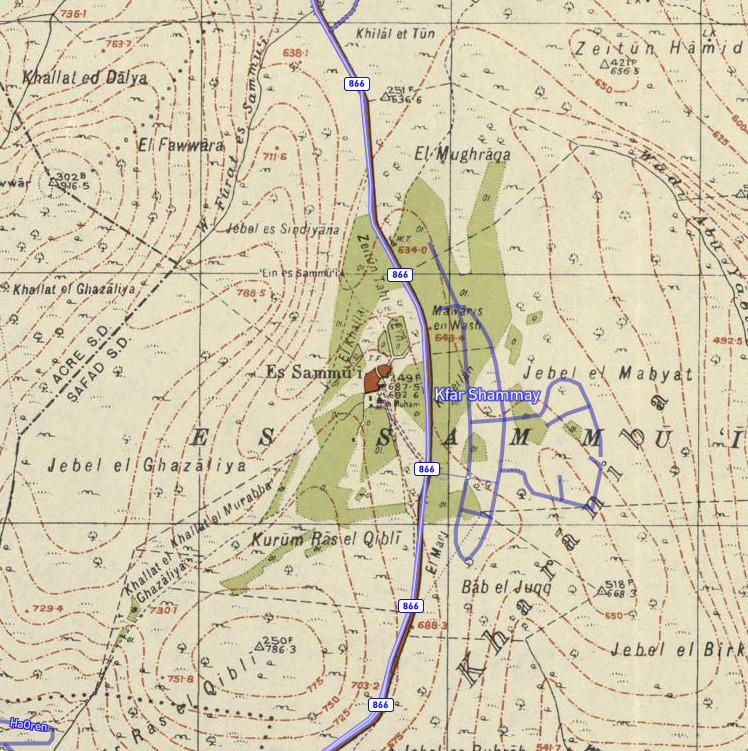
- 1870s map 1940s map modern map 1940s with modern overlay map A series of historical maps of the area around Al-Sammu'i (click the buttons)

- Location within Mandatory Palestine
- Coordinates: 32°57′29″N 35°27′11″E
- Palestine grid: 192/262
- Geopolitical entity: Mandatory Palestine
- Subdistrict: Safad
- Date of depopulation: May 12, 1948

Area
  - Total: 15,135 dunams (15.135 km^{2}; 5.844 sq mi)

Population (1945)
  - Total: 310
- Cause(s) of depopulation: Influence of nearby town's fall

Al-Sammu'i (Arabic: السموعي) was a Palestinian Arab village in the Safad Subdistrict. It was depopulated during the 1947–1948 Civil War in Mandatory Palestine on May 12, 1948, under Operation Hiram. It was located 4 km west of Safad. Today, Kfar Shamai is built on the site of the old village, and Amirim is built on the southern part of the village land.

In 1945, the village had a population of 310. Al-Sammu'i had a mosque and a shrine for a local sage known as al-Shaykh Muhammad al-'Ajami.

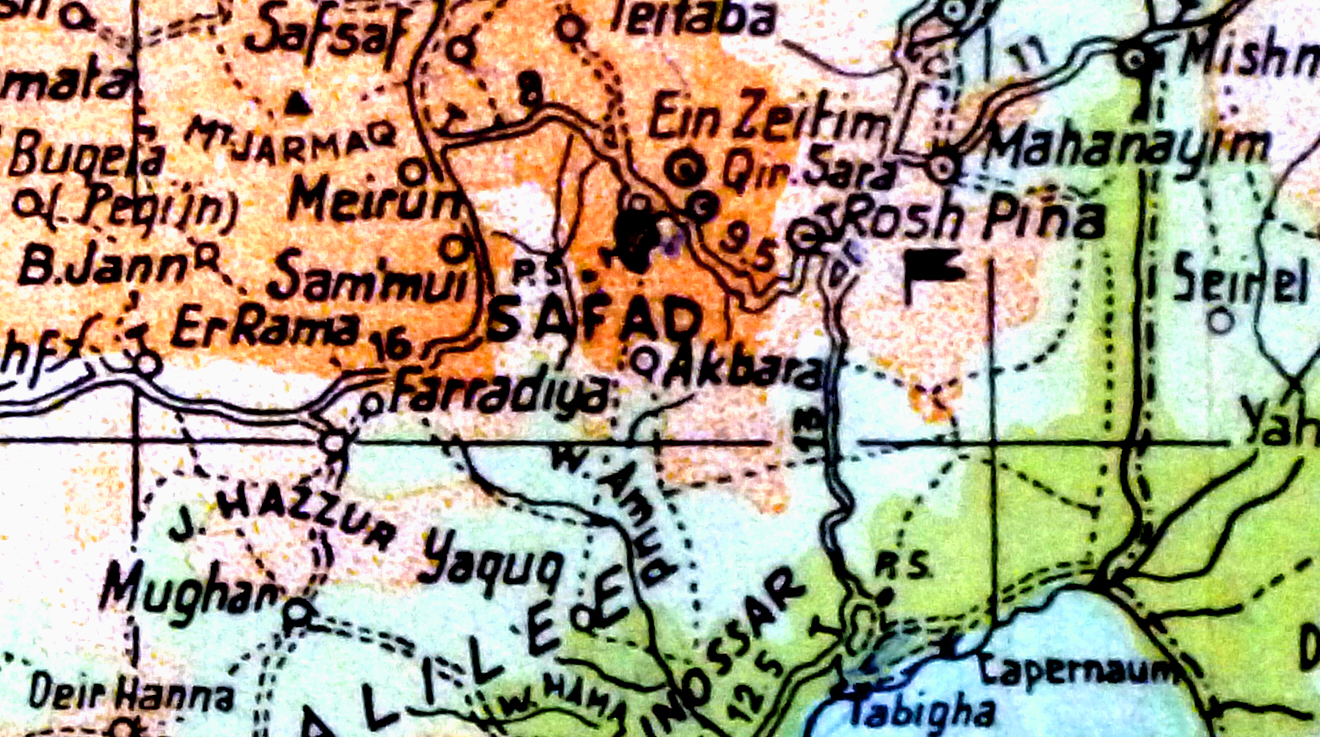
Al-Sammu'i 1946

== Bibliography ==
- Barron, J.B., ed. (1923). Palestine: Report and General Abstracts of the Census of 1922. Government of Palestine.
- Conder, Claude Reignier; Kitchener, H.H. (1881). The Survey of Western Palestine: Memoirs of the Topography, Orography, Hydrography, and Archaeology. Vol. 1. London: Committee of the Palestine Exploration Fund. (pp. 200, 256)
- Guérin, Victor (1880). Description Géographique Historique et Archéologique de la Palestine (in French). Vol. 3: Galilee, pt. 2. Paris: L'Imprimerie Nationale. (p. 455)
- Hadawi, Sami (1970). Village Statistics of 1945: A Classification of Land and Area ownership in Palestine. Palestine Liberation Organization Research Center. Archived from the original on 2018-12-08.
- Hütteroth, W.-D.; Abdulfattah, K. (1977). Historical Geography of Palestine, Transjordan and Southern Syria in the Late 16th Century. Erlanger Geographische Arbeiten, Sonderband 5. Erlangen, Germany: Vorstand der Fränkischen Geographischen Gesellschaft. ISBN 3-920405-41-2.(p. 177)
- Karmon, Y. (1960). "An Analysis of Jacotin's Map of Palestine" (PDF). Israel Exploration Journal. 10 (3, 4): 155–173, 244–253. Archived from the original (PDF) on 2017-12-01. (Karmon, 1960, p. 165 Archived 2017-12-01 at the Wayback Machine)
- Khalidi, Walid (1992). All That Remains: The Palestinian Villages Occupied and Depopulated by Israel in 1948. Washington D.C.: Institute for Palestine Studies. ISBN 0-88728-224-5.
- Mills, E., ed. (1932). Census of Palestine 1931. Population of Villages, Towns and Administrative Areas. Jerusalem: Government of Palestine.
- Morris, Benny (2004). The Birth of the Palestinian Refugee Problem Revisited. Cambridge University Press. ISBN 978-0-521-00967-6.
- Palmer, E. H. (1881). The Survey of Western Palestine: Arabic and English Name Lists Collected During the Survey by Lieutenants Conder and Kitchener, R. E. Transliterated and Explained by E.H. Palmer. Committee of the Palestine Exploration Fund. (p. 93)
- Rhode, Harold (1979). Administration and Population of the Sancak of Safed in the Sixteenth Century. Columbia University. Archived from the original on 2020-03-01.
- Robinson, E.; Smith, E. (1841). Biblical Researches in Palestine, Mount Sinai and Arabia Petraea: A Journal of Travels in the year 1838. Vol. 3. Boston: Crocker & Brewster. (p. 336, and 2nd appendix, p. 134)
- Robinson, Edward; Smith, Eli (1856). Later Biblical Researches in Palestine and adjacent regions: A Journal of Travels in the year 1852. London: John Murray. (p. 72)
- Schumacher, G. (1888). "Population list of the Liwa of Akka". Quarterly Statement - Palestine Exploration Fund. 20: 169–191. (p. 190)
