= Kfar Shamai =

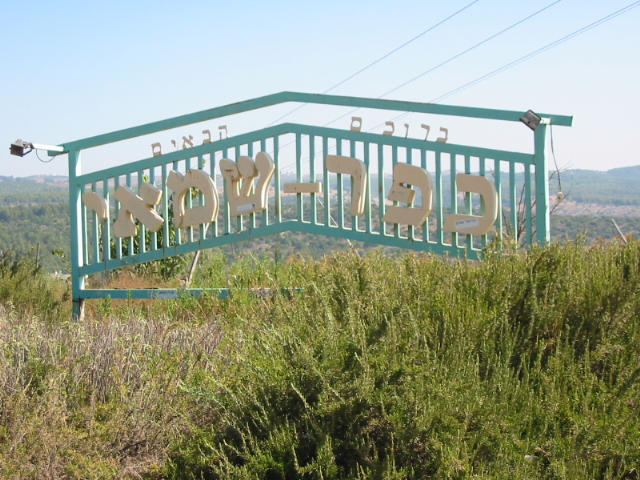

- Location within Northeast Israel
- Coordinates: 32°57′24″N 35°27′25″E
- Country: Israel
- District: Northern
- Subdistrict: Safed
- Council: Merom HaGalil
- Affiliation: Hapoel HaMizrachi
- Founded: 1949
- Founder: Immigrants from Yemen
- Population (2024): 626

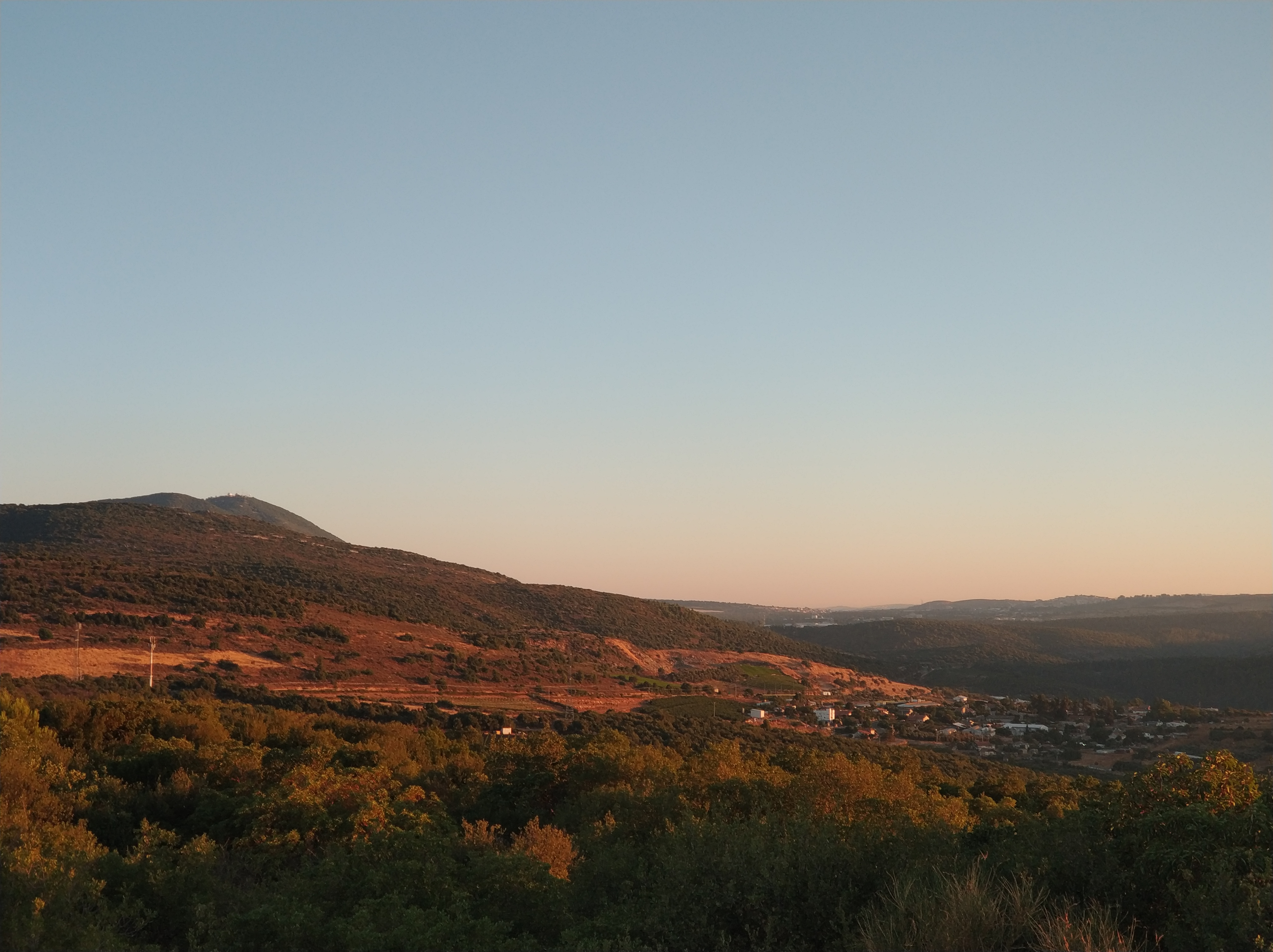
Kfar Shamai in the bottom of Har Meron

Kfar Shamai (Hebrew: כפר שמאי) is a moshav in northern Israel. Located in Upper Galilee, about 1.9 miles (3 km) west of Safed, it falls under the jurisdiction of Merom HaGalil Regional Council. In 2024 it had a population of 626.

== History ==
The moshav was founded in 1949 by immigrants from Yemen. It was built at the location of the Palestinian village of al-Sammu'i that was depopulated during the 1948 war as part of Israel's Independence war. Most of these immigrants have stayed. Over the years immigrants from Romania and Morocco joined them. Today, 2006, the moshav houses a museum for the preservation of local history since its establishment.

The name "Kfar Shamai" is based on Shammai the Elder, who was the partner of Hillel the Elder. According to Jewish tradition, Shammai was buried in Har Meron or in "Shammai Hill" near the community.
