= Ima Shalom =

1st century CE wife of Eliezer ben Hurcanus and sister of Rabban Gamaliel II

Ima Shalom (Hebrew: אִימָּא שָׁלוֹם, romanized: Imma Shalom, lit. 'Mother of Peace') is one of the few women named and quoted in the Talmud. She lived in the 1st century CE and was the wife of Eliezer ben Hurcanus, a prominent Mishnaic sage, and the sister of Rabban Gamaliel II of Yavneh, the first person to lead the Sanhedrin as Nasi after the fall of the Second Temple, which occurred in 70 CE.

Some scholars believe that, like Bruriah, Ima Shalom was the composite of several people. In some traditions, she was Rabbi Eliezer's second wife since he married his young niece first (Avot DeRabbi Natan 16).

Ima Shalom is mentioned by name four times in the Babylonian Talmud (bShabbat 116a, bNedarim 20a-b, bBaba Mezia 59b, and bEruvin 63a). Rabbi Eliezer's wife is also mentioned without name in bSanhedrin 68a and in the Tosefta (Niddah 6:5).

In these texts, she often questions her husband. She also works with her brother to expose a corrupt judge.

== See also ==
- Yalta (Talmudic character)
- Bruriah
