= Eliezer ben Hyrcanus =

1st/2nd-century Judean rabbi and tanna

Eliezer ben Hyrcanus (or Hurcanus) (Hebrew: אליעזר בן הורקנוס) was one of the most prominent Judean Tannaim (Talmudic sages) of 1st- and 2nd-century Judaism, a disciple of Rabban Yohanan ben Zakkai according to the Pirkei Avot 2:8 and Avot of Rabbi Natan 6:3 and 14.5, and a colleague of Gamaliel II (whose sister, Ima Shalom, he married) and Joshua ben Hananiah according to Bava Batra 10b. He is the fifth most frequently mentioned sage in the Mishnah.

Frequently known as 'Eliezer the Great', Eliezer ben Hyrcanus is not to be confused with the author of Pirkei De-Rabbi Eliezer, a pseudepigraphic work of the later Geonim (c. 8th-11th century).

== Biography ==
=== Introduction to Torah ===
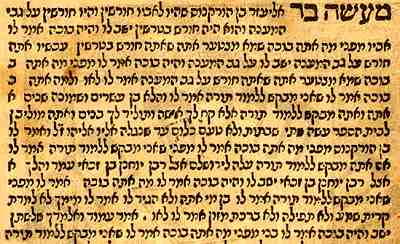
Text from Pirke De Rabbi Eliezer in Hebrew

Hyrcanus was a member of the Jewish priestly class, the kohanim according to Korban Ha'eidah to the Jerusalem Talmud, Sotah 3:4. His earlier years are known only through legend; it may be inferred that he was somewhat older when a desire to study Torah first compelled him—contrary to the wishes of his father—to desert his regular occupation and depart for Jerusalem to devote himself to his studies. In Jerusalem, he entered the academy of Yochanan ben Zakkai and, for years, studied diligently despite enduring great privation. Ben Zakkai, recognizing Eliezer's receptive and retentive mind, styled him "a plastered cistern that loses not a drop, even a cask coated with pitch that preserves its wine." His intellect was so pronounced that in later years he could declare, "I have never taught anything which I had not learned from my masters." according to Sukkah 28a.

In the meantime, his father determined to disinherit him, and with that purpose in view, he went to Jerusalem to read his will before Yochanan ben Zakkai. Ben Zakkai, having heard of Hyrcanus's arrival and the purpose of his visit, instructed the usher to reserve a seat among those to be occupied by the elite of the city and appointed Eliezer lecturer for that day. At first, the latter hesitated to venture into Ben Zakkai's place, but pressed by the master and encouraged by his friends, he delivered a discourse, gradually displaying great knowledge. Having recognized his truant son in the lecturer and hearing the praises that Ben Zakkai showered on him, Hyrcanus now desired to transfer all his earthly possessions to Eliezer. Overjoyed at the reconciliation, Eliezer declined to take advantage of his brothers and requested only his proportionate share. He continued his attendance at Ben Zakkai's academy until near the end of the siege of Jerusalem, when he and Joshua assisted in smuggling their Ben Zakkai out of the city and into the Roman camp.

Subsequently, Eliezer proceeded to Yavne, where he later became a member of the Sanhedrin under the presidency of Gamaliel II, though he had established, and for many years afterward conducted, his academy at Lydda. His fame as a great scholar had in the meantime spread; Rabban Yochanan ben Zakkai himself declared that Eliezer was unequaled as an expositor of traditional law. Many promising students, among them Akiva, attached themselves to his school.

Eliezer became known as "Eliezer ha-Gadol" ("the Great". Generally, however, he is styled simply "R. Eliezer"), and with reference to his legal acumen and judicial impartiality in Deuteronomy 16:20—"Justice, justice shall you pursue"—was thus explained: "Seek a reliable court: go after R. Eliezer to Lod, or after Yohanan ben Zakkai to Beror Ḥayil." Once, he accompanied Gamaliel and Joshua on an embassy trip to Rome.

=== Conservatism ===
Rabbi Eliezer was very severe and somewhat domineering with his pupils and colleagues, a characteristic which occasionally led to unpleasant encounters. The main feature of his teaching was a strict devotion to tradition: he objected to allowing the Midrash or the paraphrastic interpretation to pass as authority for religious practice. In this respect, he sympathized with the conservative school of Shammai, which opposed giving too much scope to the interpretation—hence the assertion that he was a disciple of the School of Shammai. Still, he was a disciple of Yohanan ben Zakkai, who was one of Hillel the Elder's most prominent pupils.

Eliezer's conservatism brought him into conflict with his colleagues and contemporaries, who realized that such conservatism might be fatal to the proper development of the Oral Torah. It was also felt that the circumstances brought on by the destruction of the Temple at Jerusalem and the disappearance of national independence required a strong religious central authority to which individual opinion must yield.

=== Excommunication ===
The Talmud relates that Eliezer was eventually excommunicated by the Sanhedrin after an intense debate about the susceptibility to Levitical uncleanness of an akhnai oven. Eliezer staunchly believed that the oven was not susceptible to impurity, while the majority decided that such an oven could become unclean. After seeing that there was no possibility of persuading the majority to change their opinion, he allegedly called upon a carob tree, a nearby stream, the walls of the house of study, and even a heavenly voice to prove his opinion correct. The rabbis refused to accept any of these miracles as proof, leading to the famous statement that 'it [Torah] is not in heaven', which is taken to mean that the ultimate authority lies with the majority, rather than a 'divine voice'.

It was deemed necessary to make an example of him, and he was excommunicated. The rabbis were fearful to inform him of their decision, so Rabbi Akiva, his disciple, volunteered to break the news. He dressed in traditional mourning attire, seated himself at some distance from him, and told him respectfully, "My master, it appears to me that your colleagues are distancing themselves from you." Eliezer readily took in the situation and submitted to the sentence. According to the Talmud, because Akiva broke the news gently, Eliezer (who had the power to destroy the world) annihilated no more than one-third of crops worldwide and burned only those things that were within his field of view. Gamaliel, the head of the Sanhedrin at the time, encountered a tsunami, which he calmed by praying to god, explaining that he only acted for the sake of god and not out of any selfish means, so that "disputes would not prolierate amoung israel". Thenceforth Eliezer lived in retirement, removed from the center of Jewish learning, though occasionally some of his disciples visited him and informed him of the transactions of the Sanhedrin.

Judah haNasi, the primary redactor and editor of the Mishnah, ruled that Halacha is by Rabbi Eliezer but felt that, due to his unpopularity, he could only relay over Rabbi Eliezer's rulings in the name of the sages.

=== Roman charge of heresy ===
Rabbinic accounts in the Tosefta, the Babylonian Talmud, and the Kohelet Rabba all relate that Eliezer was arrested for "heresy" after agreeing with a religious teaching proposed by a man named Yaakov who was a follower of Jesus of Nazareth. Scholars connect this arrest and subsequent trial with the persecution of Christians by Roman authorities as demonstrated in the letters between the Emperor Trajan and Pliny the Younger. That is, the Romans arrested Eliezer under the charge of being a Christian not understanding that he was a prominent Jewish scholar; a pagan may have denounced him as a Christian in a deliberate attempt to sow discord in the Jewish community. According to Pliny, Christians who refused to recant their Christian belief were executed; Christians who recanted their beliefs and prayed to Roman gods had their charges dismissed. Eliezer was neither a Christian nor a pagan, and he had his charges dismissed apparently by making an ambiguous statement that the Roman judge understood as acknowledging Roman authority but which Eliezer understood as recognizing the authority of the Jewish God.

The rabbinic accounts do not reference the broader context of Roman persecution of Christians and instead focus on specific points of Jewish Halakha. The accounts state that Eliezer was charged with being a heretic and was summoned before the penal tribunal. Being asked by the Roman governor, "How can a great man like you engage in such idle things?" he replied, "Blessed is the True Judge." The judge, thinking that Rabbi Eliezer was speaking about him, released him, while Rabbi Eliezer understood by "judge" God, justifying the judgment of God which had brought this trial upon him. That he should be suspected of apostasy grieved him sorely, and though some of his pupils tried to comfort him, he remained for some time inconsolable. At last he remembered that once, while on a road of Sepphoris, he had met a follower of Jesus, Yaakov of Kfar Sikhnin, who communicated to him a singular Halakha in the name of Yeshu ha-Notzri that he had approved of. For this, he reflected, he was arrested for heresy for transgressing the teachings of the Torah or (in another variant in Midrash Haggadol on Deuteronomy 23:19) his fellows. He specified what injunction had been broken citing: "Remove thy way far from her, and come not nigh the door of her house," which the sages applied to broad sectarianism as well as to heresy. The suspicion of apostasy and the summons before the dreaded tribunal came, therefore, as just punishment. This event in his life may have suggested to him the ethical rule, "Keep away from what is indecent and from that which appears to be indecent". It is suggested that his sayings, "Instructing a woman in the Law is like teaching her blasphemy," "Let the Law be burned rather than entrusted to a woman," and "A woman's wisdom is limited to the handling of the distaff," also dated from that time, he has noticed that women were easily swayed in matters of faith.

=== Censure ===
Separated from his colleagues and excluded from the deliberations of the Sanhedrin, Eliezer passed his last years of life unnoticed and in comparative solitude. It is probably from this melancholy period that his aphorism dates:

Let the honor of thy colleague (variant, "pupils") be as dear to thee as thine own, and be not easily moved to anger. Repent one day before thy death. Warm thyself by the fire of the wise men, but be cautious of their burning coals ("slight them not"), that thou be not burned; for their bite is the bite of a jackal, their sting is that of a scorpion, their hissing is that of a snake, and all their words are fiery coals.

When asked how one can determine the day before his death, he answered: "So much the more must one repent daily, lest he die tomorrow; and it follows that he must spend all his days in piety."

=== Death ===
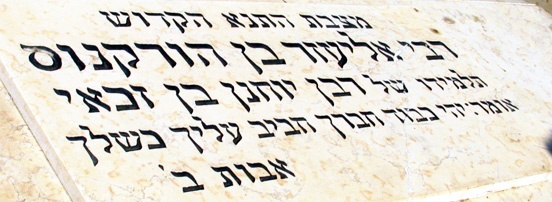
Rabbi Eliezer ben Hyrcanus' memorial in the ancient Jewish cemetery in Tiberias carries the epitaph, "He said, 'Let the honor of your fellow be as dear to you as your own'" (Avot 2:10).

When his former colleagues heard of his approaching death, the most prominent among them hastened to his bedside at Caesarea. He began to complain about his long isolation when they appeared before him. They tried to mollify him by professing great and unabated respect for him and averring that only the lack of opportunity had kept them away. He felt that they might have profited from his teaching. They besought him to communicate laws concerning specific points, particularly touching Levitical purity and impurity. He consented and answered question after question until his breath left him. The last word he uttered was "tahor" ("pure"), and this the sages considered as an auspicious omen of his purity after they all tore their garments in token of mourning, and Joshua ben Hananiah revoked the sentence of excommunication.

Eliezer died on a Friday, and after the following Sabbath, his remains were solemnly conveyed to Lydda, where he had formerly conducted his academy, and there he was buried. Many and earnest were the eulogies pronounced over his bier. R. Joshua is said to have kissed the stone on which Eliezer used to sit while instructing his pupils and to have remarked, "This stone represents Sinai, and he who sat on it represented the Ark of the Covenant." R. Akiva applied to Eliezer the terms which Elisha had used for Elijah and which Joash subsequently applied to Elisha himself: "O my father, my father, the chariot of Israel, and the horsemen thereof."
