= Houses of Hillel and Shammai =

Schools of thought in ancient Judaism

The House of Hillel (Beit Hillel) and House of Shammai (Beit Shammai) were two schools of thought in Jewish scholarship during the period of the Zugot (transl. pairs). The houses were named after the sages, Rabbi Hillel and Rabbi Shammai (of the last century BCE and the early 1st century CE), who founded them. These two schools had vigorous debates on matters of ritual practice, ethics, and theology, which were critical for shaping the Oral Torah and, later, Rabbinic Judaism as it is today.

The Mishnah mentions the disagreement of Hillel and Shammai as one that had lasting positive value for Jewry and Judaism:

Every dispute that is for the sake of Heaven, will in the end endure; But one that is not for the sake of Heaven, will not endure. Which is the controversy that is for the sake of Heaven? Such was the controversy of Hillel and Shammai. And which is the controversy that is not for the sake of Heaven? Such was the controversy of Korah and all his congregation.

In most cases (though not always), Hillel's opinion was the more lenient and tolerant of the two. In nearly all cases, Hillel's opinion was accepted as normative by Halakha and remains in effect.

== Halachic disputes ==
=== Examples ===
Only three, or according to some authorities, five disputes are recorded between Hillel and Shammai themselves. However, with time the differences between their respective schools multiplied, to the point that hundreds of disputes between them are recorded in the Talmud. The split between them was so deep that, according to the Talmud, "the Torah became like two Torahs".

The matters they debated included:

- Admission to Torah study: Beit Shammai believed only worthy students should be admitted to study Torah. Beit Hillel believed that Torah may be taught to anyone, in the expectation that they will repent and become worthy.
- White lies: Whether one should tell an ugly bride she is beautiful. Beit Shammai said it was wrong to lie, and Beit Hillel said that all brides are beautiful on their wedding day.
- Divorce: Beit Shammai held that a man may divorce his wife for only a serious transgression, but Beit Hillel allowed divorce for even trivial offenses, such as burning a meal.
- Hanukkah: Beit Shammai held that, on the first night, eight lights should be lit, and then one should decrease the number on each successive night, ending with one on the last night. In contrast, Beit Hillel held that one should start with one light and increase the number on each night, ending with eight. Beit Hillel's rationale is that, as a general rule in Halakha, one increases holiness, rather than decreasing. Beit Shammai's opinion was based on the halachic principle that allows one to derive law using similarities. The Sukkot Temple sacrifices involved 70 bullocks, reducing by one each day from 13 down to 7.
- Tu Bishvat: Beit Hillel holds that the new year for trees is on the 15th of the Jewish month of Shevat. Beit Shammai says it is on the 1st of Shevat. Beit Hillel's opinion is now accepted, and the new year is commonly known as Tu Bishvat (literally "15th of Shevat").
- Forgetting to say grace after meals: Beit Shammai says that one who forgot to say Birkat Hamazon, and had left where one ate, should return to that place to recite Birkat Hamazon. Beit Hillel says that one should recite Birkat Hamazon in the place where one realizes one's omission.
- The Jerusalem Talmud (Hagigah 2) brings a dispute concerning whether the laying of hands (semikhah) upon one's sacrificial animal with applied force is permitted to do on a Festival day. A division arose between the houses of Hillel and Shammai—the one permitting it, the other forbidding it. The adherents to Hillel's teaching, who permit the laying on of hands, declared:

כל גומרה דלא כויה בשעתיה לא כויה
"Any coal that does not catch afire at the start [of lighting the coals], it will no longer catch afire [when it is lit a second time]." This means that if individuals are to be saved from errors as life progresses, they must be set on the proper course from the very outset. If not, they will persist in their errors.

- Shema: Beit Shammai's opinion is that one says the Shema lying down in the evening and standing up in the morning. Beit Hillel says anyone can say it in any position they prefer.

Beit Shammai and Beit Hillel are, respectively, the eighth and ninth most frequently mentioned halakhic authorities in the Mishnah.

=== Discussion ===
In general, Beit Shammai's positions were stricter than those of Beit Hillel. It was said that "the school of Shammai binds; the school of Hillel looses". On the few occasions when the opposite was true, Beit Hillel would sometimes later recant its position. Similarly, though there are no records of Beit Shammai as a whole changing its stance, a few individuals from Beit Shammai are recorded as deserting a particular stringent opinion of the school in favor of Beit Hillel's opinion.

The final law almost always coincides with Beit Hillel, not because it constituted the majority, but because Beit Hillel studied the view of its opponents and a divine voice (bat kol) was heard in Yavne declaring a general rule of practice. As stated in a notable Talmudic sugya, "Elu ve-elu, these and those are the words of the living God, but the Halakhah follows the School of Hillel" (Eruvin 13b). Accordingly, Halakha was decided in favor of Beit Hillel since it was agreeable and forebearing (or, more literally, piteous). Not only did it teach Beit Shammai's teachings, but it cited it before its own. The ruling in accordance with the teachings of Hillel was also intended to bring conformity to Jewish practices.

Later in the elu ve-elu passage (Eruvin 13b) a disagreement is mentioned between the two schools, on whether it would have been more suitable (נוח) for humankind to have been created or not to have been created, with the school of Shammai taking the position that it would have been preferable if humankind had not been created. The passage then says something which seems to imply that the position of the school of Shammai was accepted נמנו וגמרו נוח לו לאדם שלא נברא יותר משנברא).

Modern Rabbinic Judaism almost invariably follows the teachings of Hillel, but there are several notable exceptions. The Mishna lists 18 matters in which the Halakha was decided in favor of Beit Shammai.

According to one opinion in the Talmud, while Halakha follows Beit Hillel, one may choose to follow either Beit Hillel or Beit Shammai as long as one does so consistently. However, if one follows the leniencies of both schools, one is considered evil. In contrast, if one follows the stringencies of both schools, the verse "The fool walks in darkness" is applied to one.

According to Rabbi Isaac Luria, in the future Messianic Age, Halakha will follow Beit Shammai rather than Beit Hillel.

== History ==
Both the Babylonian Talmud and the Jerusalem Talmud attribute the wide-range of disputes between the two schools of thought to the fact that the disciples of Hillel and Shammai did not fully serve their masters, to the point of understanding the fine differences in Halacha.

The political principles of Beit Shammai were similar to those of the Zealots, among whom they therefore found support. As public indignation against the Romans grew over the course of the 1st century, Beit Shammai gradually gained the upper hand, and the gentle and conciliatory Beit Hillel came to be ostracised from Beit Shammai's public acts of prayer.

As the Jewish conflict with the Romans grew, the nations surrounding Judea (then part of Roman Iudaea province) all sided with the Romans, causing Beit Shammai to propose that all commerce and communication between Jew and Gentile should be completely prohibited. Beit Hillel disagreed, but when the Sanhedrin convened to discuss the matter, the Zealots sided with Beit Shammai. Then Eleazar ben Hanania, the Temple captain and a leader of the militant Zealots, invited the students of both schools to meet at his house; Eleazar placed armed men at the door, and instructed them to let no-one leave the meeting. During the discussions Beit Shammai achieved a majority and were able to force all the remaining individuals to adopt a radically restrictive set of rules known as "Eighteen Articles"; later Jewish history came to look back on the occasion as a day of misfortune. According to one source, Beit Shammai obtained their majority either by killing members of Beit Hillel, or by intimidating them into leaving the room.

However, the fortunes of Beit Hillel improved after the First Jewish–Roman War, which had resulted in destruction of the Jewish Temple; Jewish leaders no longer had an appetite for war. Under Gamaliel II, the Sanhedrin, which was reconstituted in Yavne (see also Council of Jamnia), reviewed all the points disputed by Beit Hillel, and this time it was their opinions which won the Sanhedrin's support; on most issues, it was said that whenever Beit Shammai had disputed the opinion of Beit Hillel, Beit Shammai's opinion was now null and void.

Even though the two schools had vigorous arguments, they greatly respected each other. The Mishnah even records that the constituents of the two schools intermarried—despite their disagreements regarding the laws of marriage and divorce. According to the Talmud, each school kept track of lineages among its members to whom the other school would forbid marriage, and informed the other school of this status when marriage to such a person was proposed.

In later generations, a fast day was observed due to the conflict between the two houses, though this fast day is no longer observed. Various explanations are given of the tragedy which justified fasting: bloodshed which killed 3,000 students; or else the simple fact of the Torah being divided into two incompatible interpretations.

== Enactments ==
The Houses of Hillel and Shammai convened to discuss arcane matters of Jewish law and to decide on new measures thought essential to ensure a more universal adherence to Jewish law and practice. Together, they legislated many new enactments and passed new decrees, in an effort to ensure that the people of Israel not transgress the basic laws bequeathed to them by Moses. These enactments were, therefore, seen as safeguards by the rabbinic clergy. While some of these enactments are still binding today, others have been cancelled by scholars of later generations.

According to Mishnah Shabbat 1:4, disciples of Hillel and Shammai met in parley within the home of the astute Hananiah ben Hezekiah ben Garon to vote on many new measures and to make them binding upon Israel. Not all decisions were gladly received by the School of Hillel, but they were compelled to acquiesce unto the rulings by virtue of the greater numbers of the School of Shammai, seeing that they were the unanimous party, and whose vote was the most consequential. The Sages at the time looked with displeasure upon many of these new enactments and decrees, saying that they had gone too far and have "filled-up the measure." Many of these rulings revolve around Israelites and their relationship to the priests who are required to eat their Terumah (Heave-offering) in a state of ritual purity. Talmudic exegete, Menachem Meiri, who cites Maimonides, lists the eighteen enactments/decrees made by them as follows:

| Number | Enactment (E) / Decree (D) | Purpose of enactment or decree |
|---|---|---|
| 1 (D) | A Jew who consumes any food defiled by a "Father of uncleanness" (e.g. foods touched by carrion, or by one of the eight dead creeping things, etc. and which foods contracted thereby a 1st-grade uncleanness), his body contracts a 2nd-grade uncleanness, capable of rendering the Terumah unfit for consumption when touched by him | By making Israelites ever mindful of what they eat, as also the consequences thereof, this ensured that the priests of Aaron's descent would continue to eat their own hallowed bread in a state of ritual purity, without suspecting that it had been defiled unawares |
| 2 (D) | A Jew who consumes any defiled food that had contracted a 2nd-grade uncleanness (such as by the food touching a liquid that had been defiled by a dead creeping thing), his body contracts a 2nd-grade uncleanness, capable of rendering the Terumah unfit for consumption when touched by him | By making Israelites ever mindful of what they eat, as also the consequences thereof, this ensured that the priests of Aaron's descent would continue to eat their own hallowed bread in a state of ritual purity, without suspecting that it had been defiled unawares |
| 3 (D) | He that drinks liquids that suffer a 1st-grade uncleanness (Hebrew: tǝḥilah), his body takes on a 2nd-grade uncleanness, capable of rendering the Terumah unfit for consumption had he touched it | By making Israelites ever mindful of what they eat, as also the consequences thereof, this ensured that the priests of Aaron's descent would continue to eat their own hallowed bread in a state of ritual purity, without suspecting that it had been defiled unawares |
| 4 (D) | He that immerses his head and the greater part of his body in water that had been drawn, rather than in water which ran of itself naturally and collected into an Immersion-pool, the person's body contracts a 2nd-grade uncleanness, capable of rendering the Terumah unfit for consumption when touched by him | Since the people were used to immersing within caves where the water was often fetid and muddy, they would afterwards rinse themselves with drawn well-water from a bucket to clean themselves, from which practice they began to think that the drawn water was the principal act of cleansing, rather than the immersion in the mikveh |
| 5 (D) | A ritually clean man upon whose head and the greater part of his body there had fallen 3 logs of drawn water, the person's body contracts a 2nd-grade uncleanness, capable of rendering the Terumah unfit for consumption when touched by him | By saying that a "ritually clean man" becomes defiled thereby, even so, the man who is not ritually clean will take heed and not think to bathe himself in water that has been drawn, but rather in a ritual bath of natural rain water or spring water |
| 6 (D) | Any Jew who touches a Torah scroll, his hands contract a 2nd-grade uncleanness, capable of rendering the Terumah unfit for consumption by a priest. | To prevent Israelites from stashing the Terumah inside the Torah encasement, where mice would often come and consume the bread, but also destroy the Torah scroll in the process. Moreover, by saying that hands are defiled by touching a Torah scroll, the reader takes precaution to use a scarf as an interposing object between his bare hands and the scroll itself. |
| 7 (D) + (E) | All hands, before they are washed, suffer a 2nd-grade uncleanness, capable of rendering the Terumah unfit for consumption by the priests. Moreover, all persons must wash their hands before eating common bread. | By declaring that all hands suffer a state of uncleanness and requiring them to be washed before eating common bread, so, too, the priests will follow suit and wash their own hands before eating their hallowed bread. Moreover, since hands are normally fidgety, and are prone to touch defiled liquids, removing the suspected impurity through washing can prevent a further spread of defilement to hallowed things. |
| 8 (D) | A Jew who ate any food that came in contact with a liquid touched by unwashed hands, his body contracts a 2nd-grade uncleanness. The same rule applies to liquids contained in a vessels wherein one of the dead creeping things had fallen | By saying that a person is capable of contracting defilement from liquids touched by unwashed hands, he will thereby become doubly cautious about liquids wherein one of the eight dead creeping things had fallen. Likewise, by saying that a person is capable of contracting defilement by liquids in a vessel wherein one of the dead creeping things had fallen, he will thereby become doubly cautious about liquids (e.g. spittle, urine, etc.) that issue forth from a zav (i.e. the man who has suffered a running issue from his flesh) |
| 9 (D) | He that inadvertently left a vessel beneath a channel that carried water at a time when rain clouds were massing, even though in the interim the clouds dissipated and later returned, the water collected in the vessel is deemed "water that has been drawn" and would disqualify a mikveh (ritual bath) had it trickled down into an Immersion-pool. | To prevent Israel from making use of drawn water in a mikveh (ritual ablution for purification). |
| 10 (D) | Corpse uncleanness can be conveyed by all movable objects by way of overshadowing when the same movable objects have the thickness of a medium-sized plough-handle (which, although it is less than one handbreadth when measured in a straight line or in diameter, its circumference measures one handbreadth), particularly, whenever one end of that movable object hangs over a deceased person whilst the other end of the same object hangs over a vessel | To instill within the hearts and minds of the people that, by a received tradition from Sinai, corpse uncleanness is conveyed to the person who carries his plough, or like objects, in one hand and passes with it over a grave, on the condition that that very object has the thickness (in diameter) of one handbreadth (ṭefach), or what is approximately 8 cm. (3.1 inches) to 9 cm. (3.5 inches). Had the thickness (diameter) of that object been less than a handbreadth, but its circumference equaled a handbreadth, the same object conveys corpse uncleanness to its carrier and to utensils by a rabbinic decree, whenever it overshadows them and a grave. By being mindful of the measurements prescribed by a rabbinic injunction, one also takes heed to the laws governing overshadowing, as passed down from Sinai |
| 11 (D) | He that picks grapes for pressing in the wine press, the grapes immediately become susceptible to uncleanness—even though the picker had taken precaution to keep himself clean from all defilement and had not brought the grapes into contact with other liquids | By saying that the grapes are immediately rendered susceptible to uncleanness, the owner will be mindful that his harvested grapes are only one step away from contracting uncleanness if not carefully guarded by him. The owner of the grapes, whether over himself or over his hired laborers, will be doubly cautious during the vintage season and avoid having the fruit laid-up within defiled baskets, or else within baskets lined with pitch where he would have, on other occasions, been interested in retaining their moisture content. Moreover, during the harvest season, the gatherers of the grapes are required to make sure that their bodies are ritually clean, otherwise, they may render invalid the portion destined to be Terumah (Heave-offering) |
| 12 (D) | Produce that had been separated as Terumah unto the priest, although the produce was later defiled and could not be consumed by the priest, whatsover is planted or sown from the original Terumah produce is, likewise, considered Terumah (i.e. has the same sanctity as Terumah) | To prevent a priest of Aaron's lineage from taking grain separated unto him as Terumah, which same had become defiled, and replanting it to make use of the second crop in an ordinary fashion, such as by selling it. The rabbinic decree also comes to prevent him from delaying its burning, out of concern that he might inadvertently transgress by eating the defiled grain in the meantime. (This rabbinic decree applies only to defiled Terumah produce in the hands of the priest, but not to untainted Terumah produce in the hand of an Israelite and which may have been resown or replanted) |
| 13 (E) | A Jew who is traveling with a Gentile when the sun is close to setting on a Friday evening (Sabbath eve), he gives his purse to a Gentile to carry for him on the Sabbath | To prevent the Jew (who fails to reach his destination when the Sabbath day begins) from being compelled to walk with his purse four cubits in the public domain on the Sabbath day. (Normally, it is prohibited for a Jew to request a non-Jew to do work for him on the Sabbath day. However, in this case, since the Jew will not voluntarily take leave of his money while on his journey, and runs the risk of carrying it on the Sabbath day, the rabbis permitted him to make use of the Gentile in such extenuating circumstances) |
| 14 (E) | Prohibition of eating bread baked by Gentiles | To prevent the development of a bond between a Jewish man and non-Jewish woman and their intermarrying. In the final analysis, this prohibition also serves to distance the people of Israel from idolatry |
| 15 (E) | Prohibition of Jews making use of olive oil prepared by Gentiles | Vessels in which oil is contained thought to have been contaminated by unclean foodstuffs and that the same impurity would be imparted to the oil. |
| 16 (E) | Prohibition of drinking wine produced by Gentiles | To prevent the development of a relationship between Jew and non-Jew and their consummating a marriage |
| 17 (D) | The daughters of the Cuthim, from the moment they are born and laid in a cradle, are as menstruate women, capable of rendering defilement when touched | To dissuade Jewish males from accompanying with non-Jewish women and girls in a secluded place, and where either one may be tempted into an illicit relationship with the other. (Children born from non-Jewish women are no longer Jewish, even though their father was Jewish). |
| 18 (D) | Gentile male children nine-years old and older convey a serious-grade of uncleanness (as one who is a zav) when touched | To prevent Jewish male children from interacting with them and being lured into a licentious relationship |

The Jerusalem Talmud (Shabbat 1:4) mentions other enactments, besides these. Included therein are the prohibition of eating cheese produced by Gentiles, and the requirement of one who suffered a seminal or nocturnal emission (Hebrew: ba'al ḳeri) to immerse himself in a mikveh before reading from the Torah scroll, a ruling which was later rescinded, and the sweeping declaration that the lands of the Gentiles induce a defilement to any Jew that ventures therein.

== See also ==
- Herod the Great
- Kehilla
- Laws and customs of the Land of Israel in Judaism
- Ma'amad
- Qahal
- Tannaim
