= Yohanan ben Zakkai =

1st-century rabbi and Jewish leader

Yohanan ben Zakkai (Note: Sometimes transliterated as Johanan ben Zakkai, Yochanan ben Zakkai, or Yohanan ben Zaccai) (Hebrew: יוֹחָנָן בֶּן זַכַּאי, romanized: Yōḥānān ben Zakkaʾy; 1st century CE), sometimes abbreviated as ריב״ז ribaz for Rabbi Yohanan ben Zakkai, was a tanna, an important Jewish sage during the late Second Temple period during the transformative post-destruction era. He was a primary contributor to the core text of Rabbinic Judaism, the Mishnah. His name is often preceded by the honorific title Rabban. He is widely regarded as one of the most important Jewish figures of his time, and his escape from the Roman destruction of Jerusalem (which allowed him to continue teaching) may have been instrumental in Rabbinic Judaism's survival post-Temple. His tomb is located in Tiberias within the Maimonides burial compound.

Yohanan was the first Jewish sage attributed the title of rabbi in the Mishnah.

== Life ==
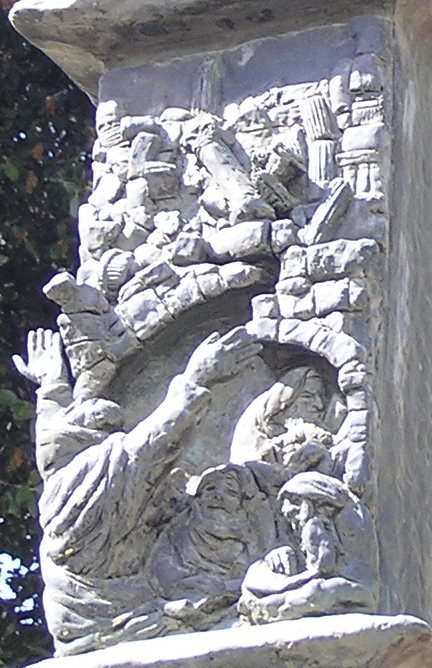
Johanan ben Zakai on the Knesset Menorah

The Talmud notes that he was one of 80 students of Hillel and Shammai. He showed incredible devotion to Torah study, and the Talmud reports that he never engaged in idle chatter nor walked even 4 cubits without engaging in Torah study. The Talmud notes the thoroughness of his study, encompassing all aspects of Torah, including all practical, analytical, and esoteric aspects.

The Talmud reports that, in the mid-first century, he was particularly active in opposing the interpretations of Jewish law (Halakha) by the Sadducees and produced counter-arguments to their objections to the interpretations of the Pharisees. So dedicated was he to opposing the Sadducean view of Jewish law that he prevented the Jewish high priest of his time, a Sadducee, from following the Sadducaic interpretation of the Red Heifer ritual.

His home at this time was in Arraba, a village in the Galilee, where he spent eighteen years. Although living among them, he found the attitude of Galileans to be objectionable, allegedly exclaiming that they hated the Torah and would therefore "fall into the hands of robbers." During the outbreak of hostilities, he settled in Jerusalem.

=== Escape from Jerusalem (Gittin 56a) ===
During the siege of Jerusalem in 70 CE in the First Jewish–Roman War, he argued in favour of peace: according to the Talmud (Gittin 56a), when he found the anger of the besieged populace to be intolerable, he arranged a secret escape from the city inside a coffin—helped by his nephew and Zealot leader Ben Batiach—so he could negotiate with Vespasian (who, at this time, was still just a military commander). Ben Zakkai correctly predicted that Vespasian would become Emperor and that the Temple would soon be destroyed. In return, Vespasian granted Yochanan three wishes: the salvation of Yavne and its sages and the descendants of Rabban Gamliel, who was of the Davidic line, and a physician to treat Rabbi Zadok, who had fasted for 40 years to stave off the destruction of Jerusalem.

=== Yavne and afterwards ===
Upon the destruction of Jerusalem, Yochanan converted his school at Yavne into the Jewish religious centre, insisting that certain privileges given by Jewish law uniquely to Jerusalem should be transferred to Yavne. His school functioned as a re-establishment of the Sanhedrin so that Judaism could decide how to deal with the loss of the sacrificial altars of the temple in Jerusalem and other pertinent questions. Referring to a passage in the Book of Hosea ("I desired mercy, and not sacrifice"), he helped persuade the Sanhedrin to—as the temple had been destroyed—replace animal sacrifice with prayer, a practice that remains the basis of Jewish worship. Eventually, Rabbinic Judaism emerged from the council's conclusions.

In his last years, he taught at Bror Hayil, near Yavne. His habit was to wear his Tefillin (phylacteries) all day, both in summer and winter. However, during the hot summer months, he only wore his arm phylactery (shel yad). His students were present at his deathbed and were requested by him, in his penultimate words according to the Talmudic record, to reduce their risk of ritual contamination conveyed by a corpse:

Put the vessels out of the house, that they may not become unclean...

More enigmatic were the Talmud's record of his last words, which seem to relate to Jewish messianism:

...prepare a throne for Hezekiah, the King of Judah, who is coming

According to the Talmud, Yochanan ben Zakkai lived 120 years. Upon his death, his students returned to Yavneh, and he was buried in the city of Tiberias; eleven centuries later, Maimonides was buried nearby. As leader of the Sanhedrin, he was succeeded by Gamliel II.

=== Yochanan's encounter with Vespasian ===
The following story is told in the Jewish classic Avoth deRabbi Nathan (version B) 4:5, about the war with Rome.

When Vespasian came to destroy Jerusalem, he said to them: 'You fools! Why do you seek to burn down the holy house? After all, what am I asking of you? I merely ask that you relinquish unto me each man his bow and arrow, and I will depart from you.' They answered him in return: 'Just as we went out against two [Roman armies] that came before you and killed them, so, too, will we go out against you and kill you!' (i.e., the reference is to the Roman general Cestius who was defeated by the Judeans in 66 CE, marking the beginning of the war with Rome).

When our Master, Yochanan ben Zakkai, heard these words, he called out to the men of Jerusalem and said to them: 'My sons, why would you destroy this city, or seek to burn down the holy house!? After all, what is he (i.e., Vespasian) asking of you? Look, he's not asking from you anything except that you relinquish your bows and arrows, and he'll depart from you.' They replied to him: 'Just as we went out against two [Roman armies] before him and killed them, so, too, we will go out against him and kill him.'

Vespasian had armored men positioned along the walls of Jerusalem, and informants within the city. Everything that they'd hear, they'd write it down upon arrows and shoot the arrows outside the wall, one of which said that Rabban Yochanan ben Zakkai was among those that admired the Caesar, and that he'd make mention of this fact to the people of Jerusalem.

When Rabbi Yochanan b. Zakkai's repeated warnings went unheeded, he sent and called for his disciples, Rabbi Eliezer [ben Hyrcanus] and Rabbi Yehoshua [ben Hananiah]. He said to them: 'My sons, stand up and take me out of this place! Make me a coffin and I'll sleep in it.' Rabbi Eliezer held on to the front end of the coffin, and Rabbi Yehoshua held on to the back end. They carried the coffin as he laid in it until sunset, until they stopped at the gates of Jerusalem's walls. The porters at the gates enquired who it was that had died. They answered them: 'It's a dead man, as if you did not know that we're not permitted to let a corpse remain within Jerusalem overnight!' The porters replied: 'If it's a dead man, remove him.' They then removed him, and remained with him until the sun had set, which, by that time, they had reached Vespasian. They opened up the coffin and he stood up before him. He (i.e. Vespasian) enquired of him: 'Are you Rabban Yochanan ben Zakkai? Ask what I shall give you.' He said to him: 'I ask for nothing, except Yavneh (Jamnia). I will go and teach therein my disciples, and I'll establish therein prayer, and I'll perform therein all of the duties prescribed in the divine Law.' He answered him: 'Go, and do all that you want to do.' Rabbi Yochanan ben Zakkai then said to him: 'Would you like me to tell you something?' Vespasian answered him: 'Say it.' He said to him: 'You are destined to rule over the Roman Empire!' He asked him: 'How do you know that?' He replied: 'Thus has it been passed down unto us, that the holy house will not be given into the hands of a mere commoner, but rather into the hands of a king, as it says (Isaiah 10:34): He shall cut down the forest thickets with an iron [instrument], and Lebanon shall fall by a mighty one.'

They said that no more than two or three days had passed when a certain messenger came from his city, informing him that Caesar had just died, and that they have nominated him to head the Roman Empire. They brought unto him a catapult made of hardened cedar wood, and turned it toward the wall of Jerusalem. They brought unto him planks of cedar wood and put them into the catapult made of hardened cedar wood, and he would hit the wall with them until he made a breach in the wall...

When Rabban Yochanan ben Zakkai heard that he (i.e., Caesar's son, Titus, who was left to govern the Roman army) destroyed Jerusalem and burnt down the holy house with fire, he rent his clothes, and his disciples rent their clothes, and they were crying and shouting and pounding their chests as mourners, etc.

== Enactments ==
Jewish tradition records Yohanan ben Zakkai as being extremely dedicated to religious study, claiming that no one ever found him engaged in anything but study. He is considered to be someone who passed on the teachings of his predecessors; on the other hand, numerous homiletic and exegetical sayings are attributed to him and he is known for establishing a number of edicts in the post-destruction era:

1. After the destruction of Jerusalem, the shofar shall be blown in beit din when Rosh HaShana falls on Shabbat (prior to the destruction, it was only blown in Jerusalem and its environs on Shabbat)
2. After the destruction of Jerusalem, the Four Species shall be taken in the hand for the entire Sukkot (prior to the destruction, it was only taken for the entire holiday in Jerusalem and on the first of the holiday elsewhere)
3. After the destruction of Jerusalem, eating of chadash (new grain harvest) shall be prohibited for the entire Day of Waving or yom haneif (i.e. the day that the omer sacrifice was traditionally offered, on the sixteenth of Nisan). Prior to the destruction, the new grain harvest could be eaten on the 16th day of the lunar month Nisan, immediately after the omer was offered in the Temple.
4. After the destruction of Jerusalem, witnesses for the new moon shall be accepted all day (prior to the destruction, witnesses were only accepted until the afternoon tamid offering)
5. After the destruction of Jerusalem, witnesses for the new moon shall only go to the place of assembly, and not follow the Nasi or "prince" (prior to the destruction, witnesses were only accepted at the location of the Nasi in Jerusalem)
6. Kohanim (those of the priestly caste) may not go up to bless the people while wearing footwear
7. After the destruction of Jerusalem, witnesses for the new moon may not violate the Shabbat except for the months of Nisan and Tishrei (prior to the destruction, witnesses were allowed to violate the Sabbath for all months)
8. After the destruction of Jerusalem, converts no longer separate monies for their conversion sacrifice (prior to the destruction, part of the conversion process was to bring a sacrifice in the Temple in Jerusalem)
9. The identity of the ninth edict is disputed:
  1. After the destruction of Jerusalem, the Second Tithe was permitted to be exchanged for money within a day's journey of Jerusalem (prior to the destruction, exchanges were only permitted for those living farther than a day's journey)
  2. After the destruction of Jerusalem, the red string associated with the chatas of Yom Kippur was sent with the ish iti (designee) to Azazel (prior to the destruction, the red string was maintained on the premises of the Temple)

== Quotes ==
If you are holding a sapling in your hand and someone tells you, 'Come quickly, the Messiah is here!', first finish planting the tree and then go to greet the Messiah.

If you have been studious in learning the Torah, do not take credit to yourself, since it is to this end that you were created.

Some of Rabbi Yohanan's comments were of an esoteric nature. On one occasion he advises that mankind should seek to understand the infinity of God, by imagining the heavens being extended to unthinkable distances. He argued that Job's piety was not based on the love of God, but on the fear of Him.

He was challenged to resolve several biblical curiosities by a Roman commander, who was familiar with the Torah, but whose name has been lost in confusion. Among the issues were the fact that the numbers in the Book of Numbers didn't add up to their totals, and the reasoning behind the ritual of the red heifer; on this latter question the answer he gave didn't satisfy his own students, so he decreed that the ritual was one that shouldn't be questioned.

Preceded by Shammai	Av Beit Din; 40–80	Succeeded by Joshua ben Hananiah
Preceded by Simeon ben Gamliel	Nasi; 70–80	Succeeded by Gamliel II

== Burial place ==
He is buried in HaRambam compound / complex in Tiberias / Tveria.

Other notable rabbis also buried in HaRambam compound / complex:

- Shelah HaKadosh
- Maimonides
- Eliezer ben Hurcanus
- Joshua ben Hananiah

== See also ==
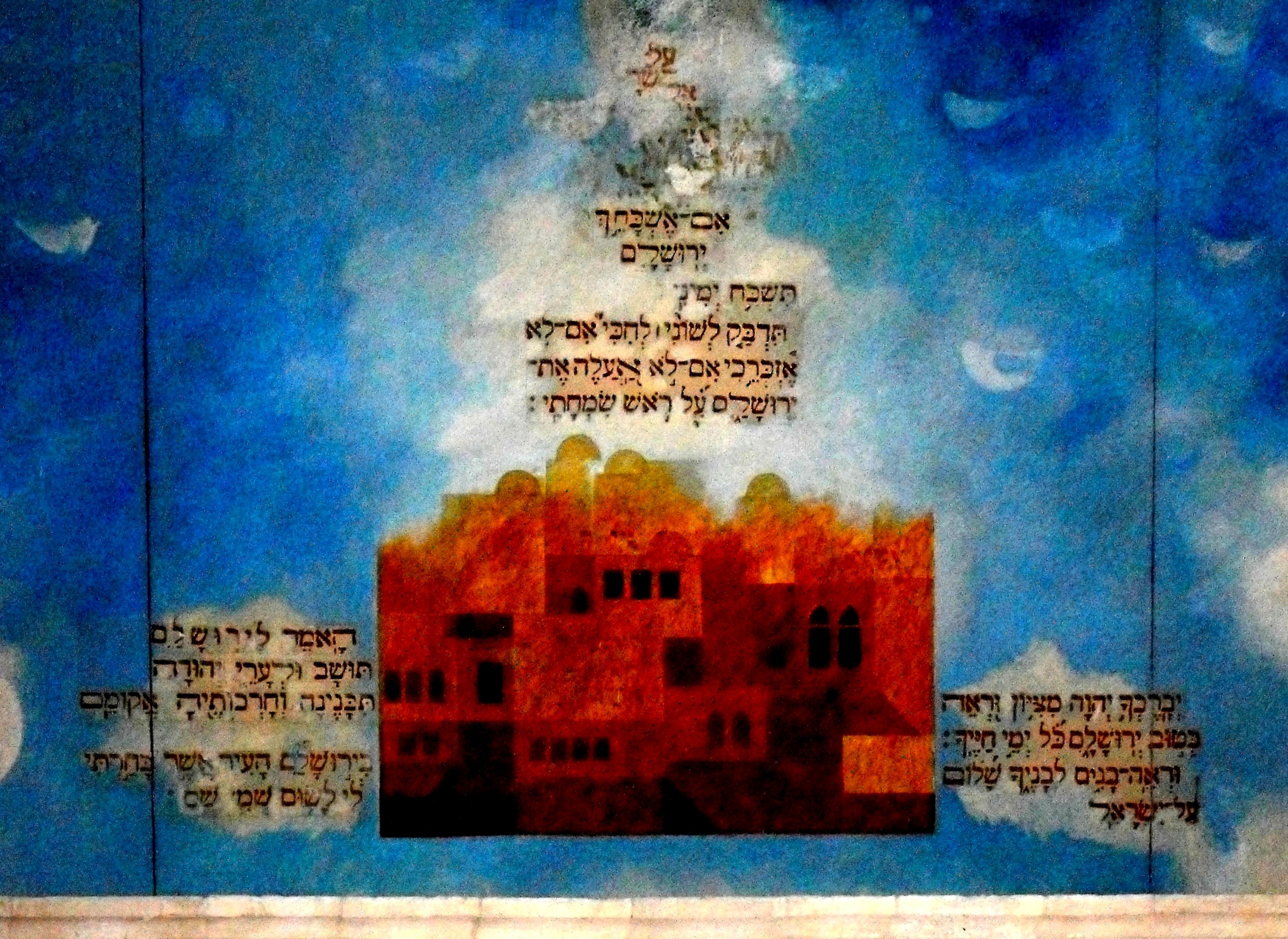
Yochanan ben Zakai Synagogue wall painting

- Yochanan ben Zakai Synagogue, located in Jerusalem's Old City
- Ben Zakai, a village in central Israel
