= Shammai =

Jewish scholar (50 BCE-30 CE)

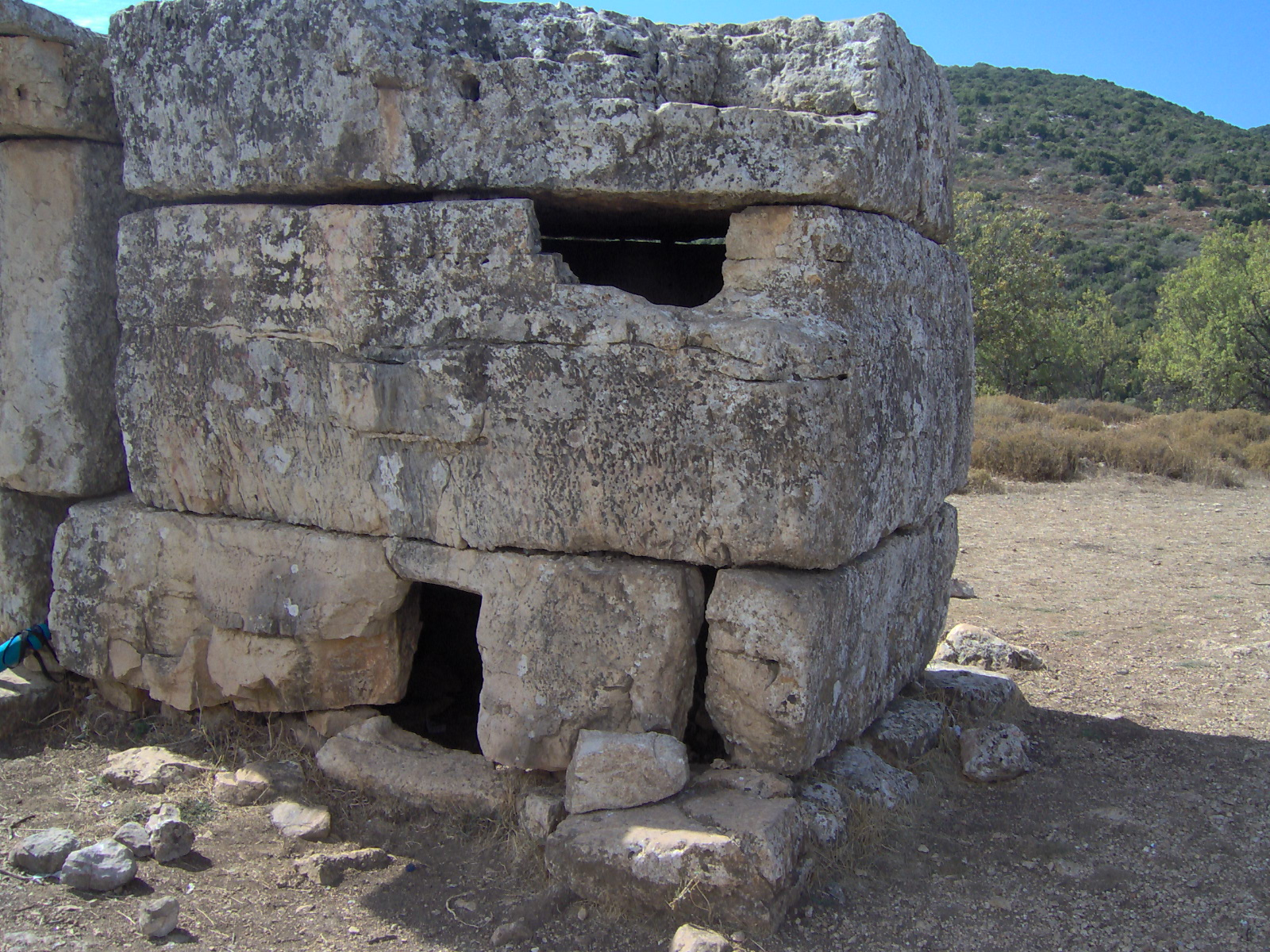
Mausoleum with two loculus graves at Khirbet Shema' on Mount Meron, dated to the Late Roman and Early Byzantine periods, and identified by a medieval tradition as the tomb of Shammai.

Shammai (c. 50 BCE – c. 30 CE, Hebrew: שַׁמַּאי, Šammaʾy) also known as Shammai the Elder (שַׁמַּאי הַזָּקֵן) was a Jewish scholar of the 1st century and an important figure in Judaism's core work of rabbinic literature, the Mishnah. Shammai was the most eminent contemporary of the sage and scholar Hillel.

His teachings mostly agree with those of Hillel, except on three issues. Both were divided over an earlier rabbinic dispute, regarding the actual laying on of hands upon a sacrificial animal on a Festival Day, which Hillel permitted. Their disciples, who had differing views to their masters, disputed many other halakhic matters. The School of Shammai, founded by Shammai, is almost invariably mentioned along with the School of Hillel, founded by Hillel. They differed fundamentally from each other. Although they were contemporaries, Hillel was nearly 60 years old at the time of Shammai's birth.

While the terms "liberal" and "conservative" may not perfectly capture the nuances of their positions, Hillel is generally considered to have been more lenient or flexible in his interpretations of Jewish law compared to Shammai. For instance, in matters such as divorce and Sabbath observance, Hillel often took a more permissive approach, emphasizing compassion and practicality. On the other hand, Shammai tended to be more stringent in his interpretations, prioritizing strict adherence to the law.

== History ==
Shammai, along with Hillel his contemporary, took on oversight of the Sanhedrin sometime after Abtalion and Shemayah relinquished power. Shammai's school of thought became known as the House of Shammai (Hebrew: בית שמאי, Beit Shammai), as Hillel's was known as the House of Hillel (Beit Hillel). After Menahem the Essene resigned from the office of Av Beit Din (or vice-president) of the Sanhedrin, Shammai was elected to it, Hillel being at the time Nasi (president). After Hillel died, circa 10 CE, Shammai took his place as president, but no vice-president from the minority was elected so that the school of Shammai attained complete ascendancy. During this time Shammai passed "18 ordinances" in conformity with his ideas. The Talmud states that when he passed one of the ordinances, contrary to the opinion of Hillel, the day "was as grievous to Israel as the day when the [golden] calf was made". According to most opinions, the ordinances, which are listed in an appendix to the ArtScroll edition of the Mishnah of tractate Shabbos, dealt with ritual purity of the Terumah and increased separation between Jews and Gentiles.

== Legacy ==
Hillel's grandson Gamaliel succeeded to the position of president after Shammai in 30 CE, but the Sanhedrin remained dominated by the house of Shammai until around 70 CE (see Council of Jamnia). A "voice from heaven" was said to have nullified the legality of the rulings of the house of Shammai, which is why Rabbinical Judaism has followed Hillel.

Shammai took an active part in the political and religious complications of his native land. Of a stern temperament, he cultivated the characteristic of firmness and strictness in law in contrast to the tireless patience which is said to have distinguished Hillel's approach. Once, when a gentile came to him and asked to be converted to Judaism (or Noahide monotheism as H. Falk argues) upon the condition of extreme brevity ("on one foot") which Shammai held to be impossible, he drove the brazen applicant away; whereas Hillel rebuked him gently by saying, "What is hateful to you, do not do to your fellow. This is the whole Torah. The rest is the explanation. Go and learn." The gentile subsequently converted.

== Religious views ==
Shammai recommended a friendly attitude toward all. His motto was: "Make your study of the Torah a permanent endeavour; speak little, but accomplish much; and receive every man with a cheerful disposition". He was modest even toward his pupils.

At a personal level, Shammai's religious views were known to be strict. He wished to make his son, while still a child, conform to the law regarding fasting on Yom Kippur; he was dissuaded from his purpose only through the insistence of his friends. Once, when his daughter-in-law gave birth to a boy on Sukkot he broke through the roof of the chamber in which she lay in order to make a sukkah of it, so that his new-born grandchild might fulfil the religious obligation of the festival.

In the Sifre it is said that Shammai commented exegetically upon three passages of Scripture: (1) the interpretation of Deuteronomy 20:20; (2) that of II Samuel 12:9; and (3) either the interpretation of Leviticus 11:34 (which is given anonymously in Sifra on the passage, but which is the basis for Shammai's halakha transmitted in Orlah 2:5), or else the interpretation of Exodus 20:8 ("Remember the Sabbath") (which is given in the Mekhilta in the name of Eleazar ben Hananiah, but which must have originated with Shammai, with whose custom of preparing for the Sabbath it accords).

Preceded by Menahem the Essene	Av Beit Din; 10 BCE – 30 CE	Succeeded by Yohanan ben Zakkai

== See also ==
- Shammaite
- Mishnah
- Hillel and Shammai
- Kfar Shamai Israeli moshav named after Shammai
