= Tannaim =

Rabbinic sages whose views are recorded in the Mishnah (approximately 10–220 CE)

Tannaim (Amoraic Hebrew: תנאים [tannɔʔim] 'repeaters, teachers', singular tanna תנא [tanˈnɔː], borrowed from Aramaic) were the rabbinic sages whose views are recorded in the Mishnah, from approximately 10–220 CE. The period of the Tannaim, also referred to as the Mishnaic period, lasted about 210 years. It came after the period of the Zugot ("Pairs") and was immediately followed by the period of the Amoraim ("Interpreters").

The root tannā (תנא) is the Aramaic equivalent of the Hebrew root shānā (שנה), which also is the Semitic root found in the word Mishnah. Shana means 'to repeat [what one was taught]' and is used to mean 'to learn'.

The Mishnaic period is commonly divided into five periods, corresponding to the generations. There are approximately 120 known Tannaim.

The Tannaim lived in several areas of Roman-ruled southern Levant. The spiritual center of Judaism at that time was Jerusalem, but after the destruction of the city and the Second Temple, Yohanan ben Zakkai and his students founded a new Council of Jamnia. Other places of learning were founded by his students in Lod and in Bnei Brak.

Some Tannaim worked as laborers (e.g., charcoal burners, cobblers) in addition to their positions as teachers and legislators. They were also leaders of the people and negotiators with the Roman Empire.

== History ==
The Tannaim operated under the occupation of the Roman Empire. During this time, the Kohanim (priests) of the Temple became increasingly corrupt and were seen by the Jews as collaborators with the Romans, whose mismanagement of Iudaea province (composed of Samaria, Idumea and Judea proper) led to riots, revolts and general resentment.

Until the days of Hillel and Shammai, the last generation of the Zugot, there were few disagreements among Rabbinic scholars. After this period, though, the Houses of Hillel and Shammai came to represent two distinct perspectives on Jewish law, and disagreements between the two schools of thought are found throughout the Mishnah.

The Tannaim, as teachers of the Oral Law, are said to be direct transmitters of an oral tradition passed from teacher to student that was written and codified as the basis for the Mishnah, Tosefta, and tannaitic teachings of the Talmud. According to rabbinic tradition, the Tannaim were the last generation in a long sequence of oral teachers that began with Moses.

Early rabbinic Bible exegesis was preserved in tannaitic texts compiled in the second century CE or later, but is likely to contain much earlier material. It certainly contains some interpretations that can be traced back explicitly to the first century CE because of parallels with motifs found in the writings of Josephus or Philo, such as the legend of the extraordinary beauty of Moses as a child.

— Martin David Goodman, A History of Judaism (2018)

== Language of the Mishnah ==
The language in which the Tannaim of Israel and Babylonia wrote is referred to as Mishnaic Hebrew, also known as לשון חכמים (lashon ḥachamim) or לשון חז׳׳ל (lashon ḥazal). Mishnaic Hebrew was used for writing between roughly 70 CE and 500 CE. Tannaitic literature, which includes the Mishnah, the Tosefta, the halachic midrashim, and Seder 'olam Rabba was redacted between roughly 70 CE to 250 CE. Research has demonstrated that Hebrew was spoken in Israel until about 200 CE, and it is generally agreed that tannaitic literature reflects the language and speech used in various regions of Israel during that time period.

== Prominent Tannaim ==
=== Titles ===
The Nasi (plural Nesi'im) was the highest-ranking member and presided over the Sanhedrin. Rabban was a higher title than Rabbi, and it was given to the Nasi starting with Rabban Gamaliel Hazaken (Gamaliel the Elder). The title Rabban was limited to the descendants of Hillel, the sole exception being Rabban Yochanan ben Zakai, the leader in Jerusalem during the siege, who safeguarded the future of the Jewish people after the Great Revolt by pleading with Vespasian. Rabbi Eleazar ben Azariah, who was also Nasi, was not given the title Rabban, perhaps because he only held the position of Nasi for a short while and it eventually reverted to the descendants of Hillel. Prior to Rabban Gamliel Hazaken, no titles were used before someone's name, which gave rise to the Talmudic adage "Gadol miRabban shmo" ('Greater than the title Rabban is a person's own name'). This is seen as the reason that Hillel has no title before his name: his name in itself is his title, just as Moses and Abraham have no titles before their names. (An addition is sometimes given after a name to denote significance or to differentiate between two people with the same name. Examples include Avraham Avinu (Abraham our father) and Moshe Rabbeinu (Moses our teacher). Similarly, Hillel is often referred to as Hillel Hazaken (Hillel the elder). Starting with Rabbi Judah haNasi (Judah the Nasi), often referred to simply as "Rabbi", not even the Nasi is given the title Rabban, but instead, Judah haNasi is given the lofty title Rabbeinu HaKadosh ("Our holy rabbi [teacher]").

=== Generations ===
The Mishnaic period is commonly divided into five generations, listed below:

1. First Generation before and shortly after the Destruction of the Temple (c. 40 CE – c. 80 CE):
  Rabban Yohanan ben Zakkai and Shimon ben Gamliel.
2. Second Generation between the destruction of the Temple and Bar Kokhba's revolt:
  Rabban Gamaliel II of Yavneh, Rabbi Joshua ben Hananiah and Rabbi Eliezer ben Hurcanus, the teachers of Rabbi Akiva, as well as Gamaliel of Yavne, Eleazar ben Arach, and Judah ben Baba
3. Third Generation around Bar Kochba's revolt:
  Rabbi Akiva, Rabbi Tarfon, Ishmael ben Elisha, Eleazar ben Azariah, Jose the Galilean, Nathan the Babylonian and Elisha ben Abuyah (the "Other" or apostate)
4. Fourth Generation after the revolt:
  Shimon ben Gamliel of Yavne, Rabbi Meir, Shimon bar Yochai (who, according to traditional lore, wrote the Zohar), Jose ben Halafta, Yehuda ben Ilai and Rabbi Nehemiah
5. Fifth Generation: the generation of Rabbi Judah haNasi, who compiled the Mishnah.
6. Sixth Generation, an interim generation between the Mishnah and the Gemara:
  Rabbi Hiyya, Shimon ben Judah HaNasi, Abba Arikha (Rav) and Yehoshua ben Levi.

== See also ==
- Oral law
- Pharisees
- Amoraim
- Savoraim
- Geonim
