= Gamaliel (disambiguation) =

Gamaliel (Heb. גמליאל), also spelled Gamliel, is a Hebrew name generally interpreted "God (אל) is my (י-) reward/recompense (גמל)". Solomon Gandz suggests instead that it should be read "battle-axe of God" (AAJR 2 pg. 37). A number of influential individuals have had the name:

== Hebrew Bible ==
- The Hebrew Bible refers to Gamaliel, son of Pedahzur, the leader of the tribe of Manasseh during the census of the Israelites in the Sinai desert (Book of Numbers 1:10; 2:20; 7:54,59; 10:23).

== Rabbinical authorities ==
- Gamaliel, also called Gamaliel I or Gamaliel the Elder, a first-century authority on Jewish law
- Gamliel II, also known as Gamliel of Jabneh
- Gamliel III, son of Judah haNasi the redactor of the Mishna, and his successor as Nasi (patriarch)
- Gamliel IV, grandson of Gamliel III, patriarch in the latter half of the 3rd century
- Gamliel V, son and successor of the patriarch Hillel II
- Gamliel VI, grandson of Gamliel V, the last of the patriarchs, died in 425
- Shimon ben Gamliel, the son of Gamaliel I, the Elder
- Shimon ben Gamliel II, the grandson of Shimon ben Gamliel

== Gamaliel in Kabbalah ==
- Gamaliel (Qliphah) is the Qliphah associated with the Sephirah Yesod on the kabbalistic Tree of Life.

== Gamaliel as a forename ==
- Gamaliel Bailey (1807–1859), a U.S. journalist
- Gamaliel Bradford (privateersman) (1768–1824), an American privateer
- Gamaliel Bradford (abolitionist) (1795–1839), a physician and early abolitionist from Boston
- Gamaliel Bradford (biographer) (1863–1932), an American biographer, critic, poet, and dramatist
- Gamaliel King (1795–1875), an American architect
- Gamaliel Painter (1742–1819), an American politician
- Gamaliel Ratsey (died 1605), an English highwayman

== Gamliel as a surname ==
- Aryeh Gamliel (1951–2021), Israeli politician
- Gila Gamliel (born 1974), Israeli politician

== Gamaliel as a middle name ==
- Warren Gamaliel Bennis (1925–2014), American pioneer of leadership studies
- Warren Gamaliel Harding (1865–1923), 29th President of the United States
- Raphael Gamaliel Warnock (born July 23, 1969), American pastor and politician

== Institutions ==
- Gamaliel Foundation, a Chicago-based non-profit providing training and consultation to affiliated congregation-based community organizations

== Places ==
- Gamaliel, Arkansas, United States
- Gamaliel, Kentucky, United States

== Phrase ==
- "Gamaliel's principle", a principle based on a story in Acts 5 in the Bible
- "Gamalielese", a term coined by H. L. Mencken to mock President Harding's speaking style
