= Joseph of Tiberias =

Joseph of Tiberias (c. 285 – c. 356) was a Jewish and later Christian theologian and statesman in Roman Palestine. Despite being a member of the Sanhedrin, the highest-ranking Jewish assembly of the time, he converted to Christianity. He is also known as Count Joseph and is venerated as Saint Joseph of Palestine. His memorial day is 22 July.

The main source about his life is a book by Epiphanius, the Panarion, written between 374 and 377. Chapter 30 retells the stories Epiphanius heard from Joseph during their encounter in Scythopolis around the year 355. According to Epiphanius, Joseph was a contemporary of Emperor Constantine, a Rabbinical scholar, member of the Sanhedrin and a disciple of Hillel II. Following his conversion, Emperor Constantine gave him the rank of count (comes), appointed him as supervisor of the churches in Palestine and gave him permission to build churches in the Galilee. Specifically, Joseph wished to build churches in Jewish towns which didn't yet have a Christian community. One of the churches attributed to him was the first Church of the Multiplication of the Loaves and Fish at Heptapegon, erected around AD 350. Despite his high position, he opposed the Arian policies of Constantine's successors, and got married after his first wife died in order to evade Arian pressure to become a bishop for that sect.

== Criticism of Epiphanius' account ==
Scholars have questioned the historicity and accuracy of Epiphanius' account on Joseph's life. Zeev Rubin points out several inconsistencies:

- During Constantine's time there was no Nasi (Prince of the Sanhedrin) named Hillel. According to Epiphanius, Hillel was succeeded as head of the Sanhedrin by a son named Judah; this does not match what is known about the Princes of the Sanhedrin. Epiphanius admits he is not sure he remembers the names well. Rubin speculates that Epiphanius might have mistakenly switched between the names of father and son, possibly Judah ha-Nasi and his son Hillel II.
- Rubin questions Epiphanius' depiction of Joseph of Tiberias as a hardline opponent of Arianism. According to Epiphanius, Joseph hosted Eusebius of Vercelli, a former bishop exiled to Scythopolis for opposing Arianism. However, in his letters Eusebius informs he was a prisoner in Scythopolis. According to Rubin, it can be assumed that Joseph cooperated with the Arian bishop, Patrophilus of Scythopolis, at keeping Eusebius under custody.
- According to Epiphanius' account, Joseph saw the Bishop of Tiberias secretly baptizing the Prince of the Sanhedrin on his deathbed. However, according to the same account, Tiberias was a predominantly Jewish city at the time. If Tiberias had no significant Christian community at the beginning of the 4th century, as implied in the account, it is unlikely that it would have had its own bishop. In the 18th century, Michel Le Quien tried to solve the discrepancy by suggesting Epiphanius referred to a bishop of a different town in the vicinity of Tiberias. According to Rubin, it can be assumed that Tiberias had a bishop by the time Epiphanius wrote down his account, but not during Joseph's days.
