= Synedrion =

Type of assembly

A synedrion or synhedrion (Greek: συνέδριον, "sitting together", hence "assembly" or "council"; Hebrew: סנהדרין, sanhedrin) is an assembly that holds formal sessions. The Latinized form is synedrium.

Depending on the widely varied constitutions, it applied to diverse representative or judiciary organs of Greek and Hellenistic city-states and treaty organisations.

== Synedria in Greek states ==
=== Macedonia ===
The supreme body of Alexander the Great's empire was also called "Synedrion". The Council was a small group formed among some of the most eminent Macedonians, chosen by the king to assist him in the government of the kingdom. As such it was not a representative assembly, but notwithstanding that, on certain occasions, it could be expanded with the admission of representatives of the cities and of the civic corps of the kingdom.

The Council primarily exerted a probouleutic function with respect to the Assembly: it prepared and proposed the decisions which the Assembly would have discussed and voted, working in many fields such as the designation of kings and regents, as of that of the high administrators and the declarations of war. It was also the first and the last authority for all the cases which did not involve capital punishment. Inside the Council ruled the democratic principles of isegoria (equality of word) and of parrhesia (freedom of speech), to which the king subjects himself like the other members.

After the removal of the Antigonid dynasty by the Romans in 167 BC, it is possible that the synedrion remained, unlike the Assembly, representing the sole federal authority in Macedonia after the kingdom's division into four merides .

=== Synedrion at Corinth ===
The League of Corinth was a federation of Greek states created by king Philip II of Macedon during the winter of 338/337 BC to facilitate his use of Greek military forces in his war against Achaemenid Persia. The league guaranteed, among other things, that member states' constitutions in force at the time of joining were guaranteed and that a Synedrion, or congress of representatives, was to meet at Corinth.

=== Synedrion at Epirus ===
In the 3rd century BC Epirus remained a substantial power, unified under the auspices of the Epirote League as a federal state with its own parliament (or synedrion). However, it was faced with the growing threat of the expansionist Roman Republic, which fought a series of wars with Macedonia. The League remained neutral in the first two Macedonian Wars but split in the Third Macedonian War (171–168 BC), with the Molossians siding with the Macedonians and the Chaones and Thesproti siding with Rome. The outcome was disastrous for Epirus; Molossia fell to Rome in 167 BC, 150,000 of its inhabitants were enslaved and the region was so thoroughly plundered that it took 500 years for central Epirus to recover fully.

== Synedrion in Judea ==
Josephus describes an aristocratic council called gerousia or senate of "elders" repeatedly in his history of the Jews, both under the Greeks from the time of Antiochus the Great (Josephus, Antiquities 12:3) and under the Hasmonean high priests and princes. Josephus uses συνέδριον for the first time in connection with the decree of the Roman governor of Syria, Aulus Gabinius (57 BC), who abolished the constitution and the then existing form of government of Israel and divided the country into five provinces, at the head of each of which a synedrion was placed. In 57–55 BC, Aulus Gabinius, proconsul of Syria, split the former Hasmonean Kingdom into Galilee, Samaria & Judea with 5 districts of synedrion (councils of law). The original aristocratic constitution of the senate began to be modified under the later Hasmoneans by the inevitable introduction of representatives of the rising party of the Pharisees.

The Talmud disagrees with Josephus' account. It states that the two most distinguished members of the Great Sanhedrin were known as Nasi [Prince] and Ab-beth-din [Father of the Beth din], while there was a third known as Mufla [distinguished]. The last named may have been a kind of expert adviser; the other two titles seem to have been purely honorary, and not to have denoted any official position. In Josephus and the New Testament it is the High Priest who is spoken of as the President of the Sanhedrin. Josephus and the New Testament also picture the Sanhedrin as an institution of some political importance; whether this institution was identical with the Great Sanhedrin of the Talmud it is difficult to say. This has led some scholars to theorize that there were two Sanhedrins, one almost entirely political and the other religious. However this theory has not gained wide acceptance.

== See also ==
- Sanhedrin
- Synod
- Synagogue
