= Hillel, son of Gamaliel III =

3rd century Jewish scholar

Hillel, son of Gamaliel III, was a Jewish scholar in the 3rd century CE (second generation of amoraim).

== Biography ==
He was son of Gamaliel III, brother of Judah II, and probably a pupil of his grandfather Judah I.

Of his early history nothing is known. As illustrating his modesty the following incidents may be quoted: He and his brother were once at Biri, where people remonstrated against their walking on the Sabbath in shoes with golden buckles, which was not customary at that place: they resignedly removed their shoes and handed them over to their accompanying slaves. On another occasion at Cabul they were about to bathe together when the people informed them that they did not consider it moral for brothers to bathe together: Hillel and his brother thereupon desisted. In either case they could have shown the people that their acts were perfectly legal, but they preferred to comply with the local customs.

While Hillel is not often quoted in connection with Jewish law, he was an able interpreter of the Hebrew Bible; this accounts for Origen seeking his society and consulting him frequently on difficult Biblical passages.

It was probably this Hillel that declared, "The Jews have no Messiah to expect, for they have already consumed him in the days of Hezekiah".

Some credit this Hillel, and not his better-known namesake, with the authorship of the following maxims: "Separate not yourself from the community"; "Be not confident in thyself until the day of your death"; "Condemn not your neighbor until you have been placed in his condition"; "Use no unintelligible expressions assuming that ultimately they will be understood"; "Say not 'When I have leisure I shall study': you may never be at leisure".
