= Simeon ben Judah ha-Nasi =

3rd-century Judean tanna

Simeon ben Judah ha-Nasi, also called Rabban b'Rabbi, was a third-century Tanna in the Land of Israel and the younger son of Judah ha-Nasi, who appointed Simeon as hakham of his yeshivah in Beit She'arim (Roman-era Jewish village).

== Biography ==
Judah ha-Nasi had always intended that Simeon only become the hakham of his yeshivah, while Simeon's elder brother Gamaliel was to be Judah's successor as Nasi. The Talmud states that Simeon transmitted traditions to illustrious contemporary scholars such as Ḥiyya the Great with whom he learned Psalms and Bar Kappara, with whom he learned halakic midrashim on Leviticus. Neither Hiyya or Bar Kappara recognized Simeon as their teacher and refused to honour him as such, which apparently upset Simeon. When his father was on his deathbed, he appointed Simeon as the hakham (similar to rosh yeshiva) of his yeshivah in Beit She'arim (Roman-era Jewish village), previously stating that Simeon was "the light of Israel".

Maimonides traditionally claimed 37 generations between him and Simeon, although this has remained unproven.

== Teachings ==
Simeon introduced several explanations in the Talmud, which he claimed to have been passed on from his father. The Talmud states that he did not approve of the fact that his father and grandfather, Simeon ben Gamaliel II cited sayings of Rabbi Meir without mentioning his name.

One of his more famous teachings is about the later chapters of Re'eh, which states a man will be rewarded for not drinking the blood of an animal sacrifice. In Mishnah Makkot 3:15, Simeon explains that because one is rewarded for resisting an unnatural urge, one is rewarded even more so for resisting a natural urge such as robbery or unnatural fornication.
