= Cabul =

Local council of Kabul, Israel

Cabul: כָּבּוּל; كابول
- Local council (from 1974)

Hebrew transcription(s)
  - ISO 259: Kabbul
  - Also spelled: al-Kabul (official)
- Location within Northwest Israel
- Coordinates: 32°52′11″N 35°12′8″E
- Grid position: 170/252 PAL
- Country: Israel
- District: Northern
- Founded: 1200 BCE (Biblical Cabul)

Area
  - Total: 7,149 dunams (7.149 km^{2}; 2.760 sq mi)

Population (2024)
  - Total: 12,589
  - Density: 1,761/km^{2} (4,561/sq mi)
- Name meaning: (Phoenician) = "what does not please"

Cabul (Biblical Hebrew: כָּבּוּל, romanized: Kābbūl), classical spelling: Chabolo; Chabulon, is a location in the Lower Galilee mentioned in the Hebrew Bible and today Kabul, Israel (Arabic: كابول, romanized: Kābūl, a town for Arab citizens of Israel 9 or 10 miles (14 or 16 km) east of Acre.

== History ==
=== Bronze and Iron ages ===
Cabul is first mentioned as one of the landmarks on the boundary of Asher in Joshua 19:27. The Life of Flavius Josephus § 43 refers to it as "the village of Chabolo situated in the confines of Ptolemais", and was the western border of Lower Galilee before joining the Phoenician coast in Josephus' other work, The Jewish War 3.3.1. It was assigned to the Tribe of Asher. The name "Kabul" may have been derived from the Aramaic word mekubbal, which means "clad", as in the inhabitants were "clad" in gold and silver.

King Solomon handed over a district in the north-west of Galilee near Tyre, containing twenty cities, to Hiram I, the king of Tyre, in repayment for his help in building Solomon's Temple in Jerusalem. Hiram was not pleased with the gift, however, and called them "the land of Cabul", the name signifying "good for nothing". The writer of 1 Kings 9 says they were called by this name "to this day". Josephus interprets "Cabul" as meaning "what does not please" (in Phoenician) but doubt has been cast on this interpretation of the term. The Pulpit Commentary suggests they were unacceptable because "really they were mere villages".

Archaeological excavations at Khirbet Rosh Zayit, located 2km northeast of modern Kabul, Israel, have revealed an Israelite settlement from the 12th century BCE and, built upon it, a Phoenician fortification from the 10th century BCE. The excavator suggests that this is evidence of Solomon's transfer of the area to Tyrian control.

=== Classical era ===
Josephus describes Cabul as being "the place that divides the country of Ptolemais from our nation" (War II 18:503). The architecture of Cabul, unlike other cities of the Galilee, was similar to that of Tyre, Sidon, and Beirut. In the First Jewish–Roman War, Cabul was attacked by Syria's governor Gaius Cestius Gallus in 66 CE. Upon the approach of the Roman army, the inhabitants of Khaboulōn (Koine Greek: Χαβουλών, translated in some English texts as 'Zabulon') and in The Jewish War 2.18.9 and 3.3.1. See: Josephus (1927). Capps, E.; Page, T.E.; Rouse, W.H.D. (eds.). The Jewish War. Vol. 2. Translated by Henry St. John Thackeray. London: William Heinemann Ltd. OCLC 59817481., s.v. War 2.18.9 (2.503) and War 3.3.1 (3.38) (Loeb Classical Library), where Thackeray preserves the correct transliteration. In William Whiston's edition of Josephus there is a gross error in his transliteration in both places, where he writes Zabulon instead of Chabulon. had fled the city, while the soldiery were given leave to plunder and burn the city. For a time it served as Josephus' headquarters in Galilee in 67 CE.

Judah II and Hillel, sons of Gamaliel III, were received as guests in Cabul with great honor and paid a visit to a local bath according to Tosefta, Shabbat 7:17 and Tosefta, Mo'ed Katan 2:15. It was the home of a 'Rabbi Zakkai' in Jerusalem Talmud, Megillah 4, 78b, etc. and was famous for its abundance of wine and oil; it also had a synagogue and public baths. After the fall of Jerusalem, priests of the Shecaniah (Shekhanyah) family settled there.

=== Middle Ages ===
In the Crusader Kingdom of Jerusalem, it was the seat of a seigniory known as Cabor.

== Aftermath ==
In 2010, an archaeological survey of Cabul was conducted by Omar Zidan on behalf of the Israel Antiquities Authority (IAA).
