= Simlai =

3rd century talmudic rabbi

Rabbi Simlai (Hebrew: רבי שמלאי) was a talmudic rabbi who lived in Israel in the 3rd century (second generation of amoraim).

He was born in either Lod or Babylonia. He later moved to the Galilee, where he served as an aide to Rabbi Yannai. He studied in Tzippori under Rabbi Yochanan and Hanina bar Hama. He then studied under Rabbi Judah II, the grandson of Judah haNasi. He attempted in vain to induce Judah II to abrogate the prohibition against using bread prepared by pagans. Late in life he moved to Babylonia.

He was a famous aggadist, and the calculation of 613 Mitzvot is attributed to him. According to the Jewish tradition, he frequently debated the Christians.
