= Sanhedrin =

Assemblies of 23 or 71 Jewish elders

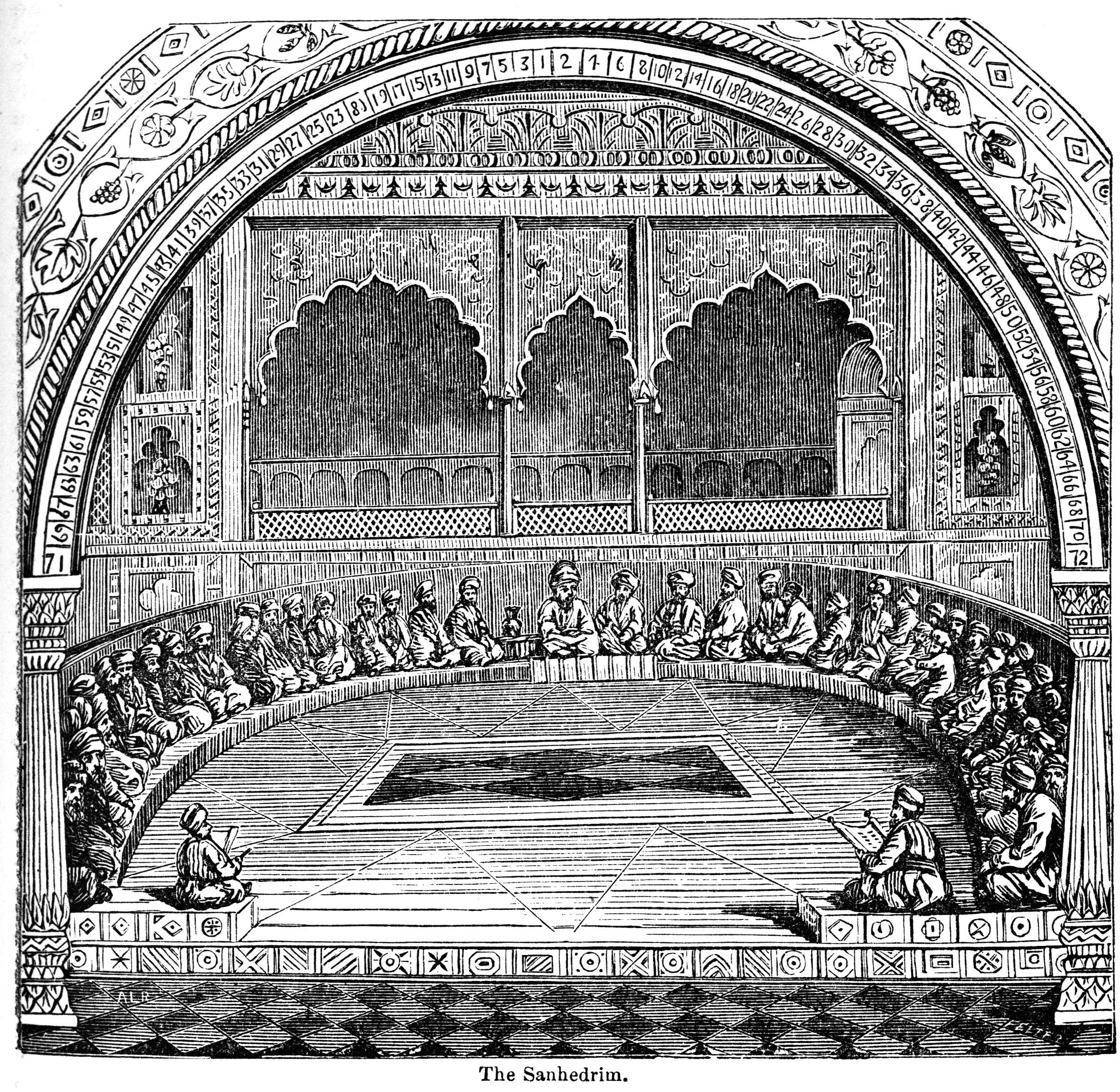
The Sanhedrin, from an 1883 encyclopedia

The Sanhedrin (Hebrew and Middle Aramaic סַנְהֶדְרִין, a loanword from Koine Greek: συνέδριον, romanized: synedrion, 'assembly,' 'sitting together,' hence 'assembly' or 'council') was a Jewish legislative and judicial assembly in the ancient land of Israel.

There were two classes of Rabbinite courts called sanhedrins: Greater and Lesser. A lesser Sanhedrin of 23 judges was appointed to sit as a tribunal in each city. In general usage, the Sanhedrin without qualifier usually refers to the Great Sanhedrin. There was only one Great Sanhedrin of 71 judges, which, among other roles, acted as a supreme court, taking appeals from cases that lesser courts decided. The Great Sanhedrin was presided over by the Nasi (lit. "prince", often translated as "president"), assisted by the Av Beit Din ("chief of the court").

In the Second Temple period, the Great Sanhedrin met in the Temple in Jerusalem, in a building called the Hall of Hewn Stones. The Great Sanhedrin convened every day except festivals and the sabbath day (Shabbat).

After the destruction of the Second Temple and the failure of the Bar Kokhba revolt, the Great Sanhedrin moved to Galilee, which became part of the Roman province of Syria Palaestina. In this period, the Sanhedrin was sometimes called the Galilean Patriarchate or Patriarchate of Palaestina, the governing legal body of Galilean Jewry. In the late 200s CE, to avoid persecution, the name Sanhedrin was dropped and its decisions were issued under the name of Beit HaMidrash (house of learning). The last universally binding decision of the Great Sanhedrin appeared in 358 when the Hebrew calendar was established. The Great Sanhedrin was finally disbanded in 425.

Over the centuries, attempts have been made to revive the institution, such as by Jacob Berab, the Grand Sanhedrin convened by Napoleon Bonaparte, and modern attempts in Israel.

== Hebrew Bible ==
In the Hebrew Bible, Moses and the Israelites were commanded by God to establish courts of judges. They were also commanded to establish a "supreme court" located at the central sanctuary (after arriving in the Land of Israel), to handle cases too difficult for local courts.

When Moses declared that the task of leading the people was too difficult for him, God had him appoint 70 elders (zekenim) to share the burden of leadership with him. According to the Mishnah, these 70 elders plus Moses himself are the source for the 71 judges of the "Great Sanhedrin". These elders are described as "the elders of the people and its officers", according to a midrash, they were the same officers who were beaten in Egyptian slavery for failing to meet Pharaoh's quota of bricks, and after the Exodus were rewarded with membership on the first Sanhedrin.

The 23 judges of the "Lesser Sanhedrin" are derived from the following exegesis: it must be possible for a "community" to vote for both conviction and exoneration (Numbers 35:24–25). The minimum size of a "community" is 10 men, thus 10 vs 10. One more is required to achieve a majority (11 vs. 10), but a simple majority cannot convict (Exodus 23:2), and so an additional judge is required (12 vs. 10). Finally, a court should have an odd number of judges to prevent deadlocks; thus 23 rather than 22.

== History ==
=== Early Sanhedrin ===
The first historic mention of a Synedrion (Greek: Συνέδριον) occurs in the Psalms of Solomon (17:49), a Jewish religious book translated into Greek.

The Hasmonean court in Judea, presided over by Alexander Jannaeus, until 76 BCE, followed by his wife, Queen Salome Alexandra, was called Synhedrion or Sanhedrin. The exact nature of this early Sanhedrin is not clear. It may have been a body of sages or priests, or a political, legislative and judicial institution. The first historical record of the body was during the administration of Aulus Gabinius, who, according to Josephus, organized five synedra in 57 BCE as Roman administration was not concerned with religious affairs unless sedition was suspected. Only after the destruction of the Second Temple was the Sanhedrin made up only of sages.

Josephus describes a synhedrion for the first time in connection with the decree of the Roman governor of Syria, Aulus Gabinius (57 BCE), who abolished the constitution and the then existing form of government of Judea and divided the country into five provinces, at the head of each of which a synhedrion was placed; Jerusalem was the seat of one of these. Later, Josephus describes Herod (at the time governor of Galilee) as being summoned before the synhedrion, led by High Priest Hyrcanus II, due to having executed alleged criminals without permission from the synhedrion. Eventually, though, Herod would go on to kill many members of this synhedrion.

The Mishnah describes the Sanhedrin in this period further. The Great Sanhedrin met in the Hall of Hewn Stones in the Temple in Jerusalem. It convened every day except festivals and Shabbat. Its members included priests, Levites, and ordinary Jews whose families had a pure lineage such that their daughters were allowed to marry priests.

=== The trial of Jesus, and early Christianity ===
A Synhedrion is mentioned 22 times in the Greek New Testament, including in the Gospels in relation to the trial of Jesus, and in the Acts of the Apostles, which mentions a "Great Synhedrion" in chapter 5 where rabbi Gamaliel appeared, and also in chapter 7 in relation to the stoning death of Saint Stephen. This body is described as a court led by the High Priest or leading priests, as well as the "elders" and/or Pharisees.

=== During Jewish–Roman Wars ===
After the destruction of the Second Temple in 70 CE, the Sanhedrin was re-established in Yavneh, with reduced authority, by agreement between Yochanan ben Zakai and Roman Emperor Vespasian. Vespasian agreed in part due to the perception that the Pharisees had not participated in the first revolt to the extent that other groups had. Thus the Sanhedrin in Yavneh was comprised almost exclusively of pharisaic scholars. The imperial Roman government recognized the Sanhedrin. They regarded the head of the Sanhedrin as their own paid government official with the status of a prefect. Roman legislation severely reduced the scope of its authority, but confirmed the body's ultimate authority in religious matters. In an attempt to quash revolutionary elements, Rome in effect declared one form of Judaism to be the only recognized form of religion. This led to persecution of sectarian groups, and attempts by these groups to find fault with the Sanhedrin before the Roman government.

The seat of the Patriarchate moved to Usha under the presidency of Gamaliel II in 80 CE. In 116 it moved back to Yavneh, and then again back to Usha.

=== After Bar Kokhba Revolt ===
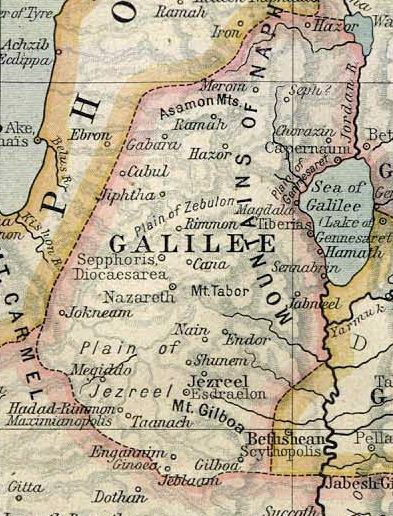
Galilee in late antiquity

Rabbinic texts indicate that following the Bar Kokhba revolt, southern Galilee became the seat of rabbinic learning in the Land of Israel. This region was the location of the court of the Patriarch which was situated first at Usha, then at Bet Shearim, later at Sepphoris and finally at Tiberias.

In the Galilee, the Sanhedrin assembled on the Three Pilgrimage Festivals, and delegations of diaspora Jews traveled there to have their questions answered.

The Great Sanhedrin moved in 140 to Shefaram under the presidency of Shimon ben Gamliel II, and subsequently to Beit She'arim and later to Sepphoris, under the presidency of Judah ha-Nasi (165–220). Finally, it moved to Tiberias in 220, under the presidency of Gamaliel III (220–230), a son of Judah ha-Nasi, where it became more of a consistory, but still retained, under the presidency of Judah II (230–270), the power of excommunication.

In the year 363, the emperor Julian (r. 355–363 CE), an apostate from Christianity, ordered the Temple rebuilt. The project's failure has been ascribed to the Galilee earthquake of 363, and to the Jews' ambivalence about the project. Sabotage is a possibility, as is an accidental fire. Divine intervention was the common view among Christian historians of the time. As a reaction against Julian's pro-Jewish stance, the later emperor Theodosius I (r. 379–395 CE) forbade the Sanhedrin to assemble and declared ordination illegal. Capital punishment was prescribed for any Rabbi who received ordination, as well as complete destruction of the town where the ordination occurred.

However, since the Hebrew calendar was based on witnesses' testimony, which had become far too dangerous to collect, rabbi Hillel II recommended change to a mathematically based calendar that was adopted at a clandestine, and maybe final, meeting in 358 CE. This marked the last universal decision made by the Great Sanhedrin.

Gamaliel VI (400–425) was the Sanhedrin's last president. With his death in 425, Theodosius II outlawed the title of Nasi, the last remains of the ancient Sanhedrin. An imperial decree of 426 diverted the patriarchs' tax (post excessum patriarchorum) into the imperial treasury. The exact reason for the abrogation of the patriarchate is not clear, though Gamaliel VI, the last holder of the office who had been for a time elevated by the emperor to the rank of prefect, may have fallen out with the imperial authorities. Thereafter, Jews were gradually excluded from holding public office. A law dated to 429, however, refers to the existence of a Sanhedrin in each of the Eastern Roman provinces of Palestine. In Tiberias, the Sanhedrin continued to function in some capacity in the 6th century, led by the rashei haperek ("heads of the chapter"). It ultimately evolved into the Palestinian Gaonate, which relocated from Tiberias to Jerusalem by the mid-tenth century.

== Powers ==
The Talmud tractate Sanhedrin identifies two classes of rabbinical courts called Sanhedrin, a Great Sanhedrin (בית דין הגדול) and a Lesser Sanhedrin (בית דין הקטן). Each city could have its own lesser Sanhedrin of 23 judges, but there could be only one greater Sanhedrin of 71, which among other roles acted as the Supreme Court, taking appeals from cases decided by lesser courts. The uneven numbers of judges were predicated on eliminating the possibility of a tie, and the last to cast his vote was the head of the court.

=== Function and procedures ===
The Sanhedrin as a body claimed powers that lesser Jewish courts did not have. As such, they were the only ones who could try the king, extend the boundaries of the Temple and Jerusalem, and were the ones to whom all questions of law were finally put. Moreover, the lesser Sanhedrin of 23 judges was the only juridical body in Israel having the statutory and constitutional authority and power to render a verdict of capital punishment to would-be offenders, and the greater Sanhedrin of 71 judges was solely authorized to send forth the people to a battle waged of free choice.

Before 191 BCE the High Priest acted as the ex officio head of the Sanhedrin, but in 191 BCE, when the Sanhedrin lost confidence in the High Priest, the office of Nasi was created. After the time of Hillel the Elder (late 1st century BCE and early 1st century CE), the Nasi was almost invariably a descendant of Hillel. The second highest-ranking member of the Sanhedrin was called the Av Beit Din, or 'Head of the Court' (literally, Av Beit Din means 'father of the house of judgment'), who presided over the Sanhedrin when it sat as a criminal court.

During the Second Temple period, the Sanhedrin met in a building known as the Hall of Hewn Stones (Lishkat ha-Gazit), which has been placed by the Talmud and many scholars as built into the northern wall of the Temple, half inside the sanctuary and half outside, with doors providing access variously to the Temple and to the outside. The name presumably arises to distinguish it from the buildings in the Temple complex used for ritual purposes, which could not be constructed of stones hewn by any iron implement.

In some cases, it was necessary only for a 23-member panel (functioning as a Lesser Sanhedrin) to convene. In general, the full panel of 71 judges was convened only on matters of national significance (e.g., a declaration of war) or when the 23-member panel failed to reach a conclusive verdict.

By the end of the Second Temple period, the Sanhedrin reached its pinnacle of importance, legislating all aspects of Jewish religious and political life within parameters laid down by Biblical and Rabbinic tradition.

=== Archaeological findings ===
In 2004, excavations in Tiberias conducted by the Israel Antiquities Authority uncovered a structure dating to the 3rd century CE that may have been the seat of the Sanhedrin when it convened in that city. At the time it was called Beit Hava'ad.

== Nasi (president) ==
Before 191 BCE the High Priest acted as the ex officio head of the Sanhedrin, but in 191 BCE, when the Sanhedrin lost confidence in the High Priest, the chair passed to the new office of the Nasi. The Sanhedrin was headed by the chief scholars of the great Talmudic Academies in the Land of Israel, and with the decline of the Sanhedrin, their spiritual and legal authority was generally accepted, the institution itself being supported by voluntary contributions by Jews throughout the ancient world.

Being a member of the house of Hillel and thus a descendant of King David, the Nasi (prince), who was the chairman of the assembly, enjoyed almost royal authority. His functions were political rather than religious, though the office’s influence was not limited to the secular realm. The Patriarchate attained its zenith under Judah ha-Nasi, who compiled the Mishnah.

Up to the middle of the fourth century, the Patriarchate retained the prerogative of determining the Hebrew calendar and guarded the intricacies of the needed calculations, in an effort to constrain interference by the Babylonian community. Christian persecution obliged Hillel II to fix the calendar in permanent form in 359 CE. This institution symbolized the passing of authority from the Patriarchate to the Babylonian Talmudic academies.

=== List of patriarchs ===
President	Term in office	
Yose ben Yoezer	170 BCE	140 BCE
Joshua ben Perachyah	140 BCE	100 BCE
Simeon ben Shetach	100 BCE	60 BCE
Shmaya	65 BCE	c. 31 BCE
Hillel the Elder	c. 31 BCE	9 CE
Rabban Shimon ben Hillel	9	?
Rabban Gamaliel the Elder	30	50
Rabban Shimon ben Gamliel	50	70
Rabban Yohanan ben Zakkai	70	80
Rabban Gamaliel II of Yavne	80	118
Rabbi Eleazar ben Azariah	118	120
Interregnum (Bar Kokhba revolt)	120	142
Rabban Shimon ben Gamliel II	142	165
Rabbi Judah I HaNasi (ThePresident)	165	220
Gamaliel III	220	230
Judah II Nesi'ah	230	270
Gamaliel IV	270	290
Judah III Nesi'ah	290	320
Hillel II	320	365
Gamaliel V	365	385
Judah IV	385	400
Gamaliel VI	c. 400	425

=== Summary of patriarchal powers ===
The following is a summary of the powers and responsibilities of the Patriarchate from the onset of the third century, based on rabbinic sources as understood by L.I. Levine:

1. Representative to Imperial authorities;
2. Focus of leadership in the Jewish community:
  1. Receiving daily visits from prominent families;
  2. Declaration of public fast days;
  3. Initiating or abrogating the ban (herem);
3. Appointment of judges to Jewish courts in the Land of Israel;
4. Regulation of the calendar;
5. Issuing enactments and decrees with respect to the applicability or release from legal requirements, e.g.:
  1. Use of sabbatical year produce and applicability of sabbatical year injunctions;
  2. Repurchase or redemption of formerly Jewish land from gentile owners;
  3. Status of Hellenistic cities of the Land of Israel re: purity, tithing, sabbatical year;
  4. Exemptions from tithing;
  5. Conditions in divorce documents;
  6. Use of oil produced by gentiles;
6. Dispatching emissaries to diaspora communities;
7. Taxation: both the power to tax and the authority to rule/intervene on the disposition of taxes raised for local purposes by local councils.

== Revival attempts ==
Since the dissolution of the Sanhedrin in or around 358 CE, there have been several attempts to re-establish it.

There are records of what may have been attempts to reform the Sanhedrin in Arabia, in Jerusalem under the Caliph Umar, and in Babylon (Iraq), but none of these attempts were given attention by later rabbinic authorities and little information is available about them.

=== Napoleon Bonaparte's "Grand Sanhedrin" ===
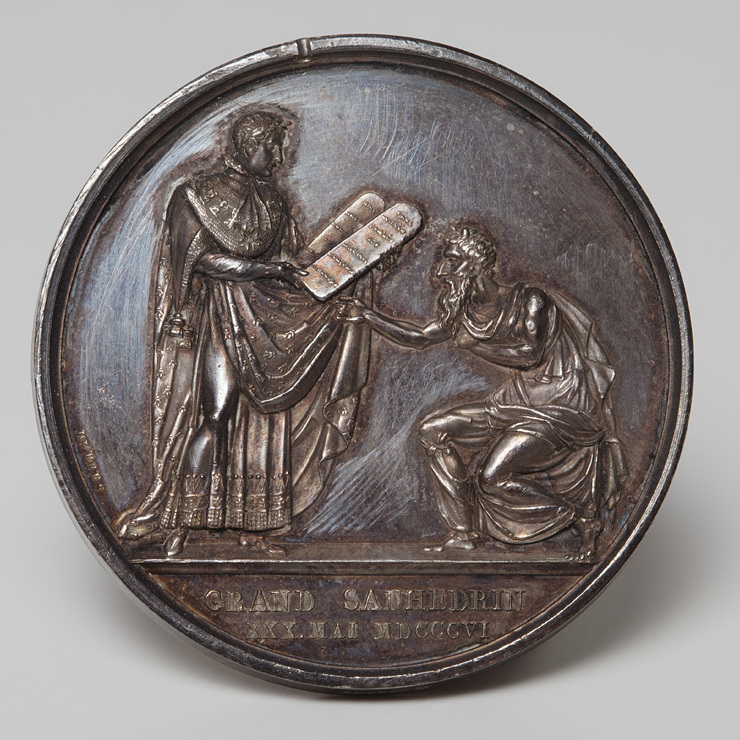
Medallion struck in honor of the "Grand Sanhedrin" convened by Emperor Napoleon I of France. In the collection of the Jewish Museum of Switzerland.

The "Grand Sanhedrin" was a Jewish high court convened by Napoleon I to give legal sanction to the principles expressed by the Assembly of Notables in answer to the twelve questions submitted to it by the government. It did not follow the halakhic procedures of the traditional Sanhedrin.

On 6 October 1806, the Assembly of Notables issued a proclamation to all the Jewish communities of Europe, inviting them to send delegates to the Sanhedrin, to convene on 20 October. This proclamation, written in Hebrew, French, German, and Italian, speaks in extravagant terms of the importance of this revived institution and of the greatness of its imperial protector. While the action of Napoleon aroused in many Jews of Germany the hope that, influenced by it, their governments also would grant them the rights of citizenship, others looked upon it as a political contrivance. When in the war against Prussia (1806–07) the emperor invaded Poland and the Jews rendered great services to his army, he remarked, laughing, "The sanhedrin is at least useful to me." David Friedländer and his friends in Berlin described it as a spectacle that Napoleon offered to the Parisians.

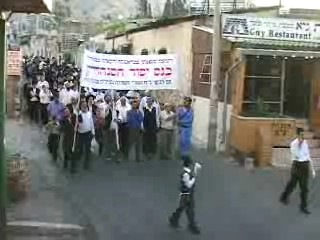
Inauguration of the Sanhedrin in 2004

=== Modern attempts ===
Maimonides (1135–1204) proposed a rationalist solution for achieving the goal of re-establishing semikhah and the Sanhedrin. There have been several attempts to implement Maimonides' recommendations by Rabbi Jacob Berab in 1538, Rabbi Yisroel Shklover in 1830, Rabbi Aharon Mendel haCohen in 1901, Rabbi Zvi Kovsker in 1940, Rabbi Yehuda Leib Maimon in 1949, and a group of Israeli rabbis in 2004.

== See also ==
- Council of Jamnia
- Beth din shel Kohanim
- Great Assembly – or Anshei Knesset HaGedolah ('Men of the Great Assembly')
- Magnum Concilium, a similar body in medieval England
- Synedrion, a general term for judiciary organs of Greek and Hellenistic city states and treaty organisations.
- Tombs of the Sanhedrin

== Bibliography ==
- Cohen, S.J.D., "Patriarchs and Scholarchs," PAAJR 48 (1981), 57–85.
- Goodman, M., "The Roman State and the Jewish Patriarch in the Third Century," in L.I. Levnie (ed.), The Galilee in late Antiquity (New York, 1992), 127.39.
- Habas (Rubin), E., "Rabban Gamaliel of Yavneh and his Sons: The Patriarchate before and after the Bar Kokhva Revolt," JJS 50 (1999), 21–37.
- Levine, L.I., "The Patriarch (Nasi) in Third-Century Palestine," ANRW 2.19.2 (1979), 649–88.
