= Hall of Hewn Stones =

Ancient meeting place in Jewish tradition

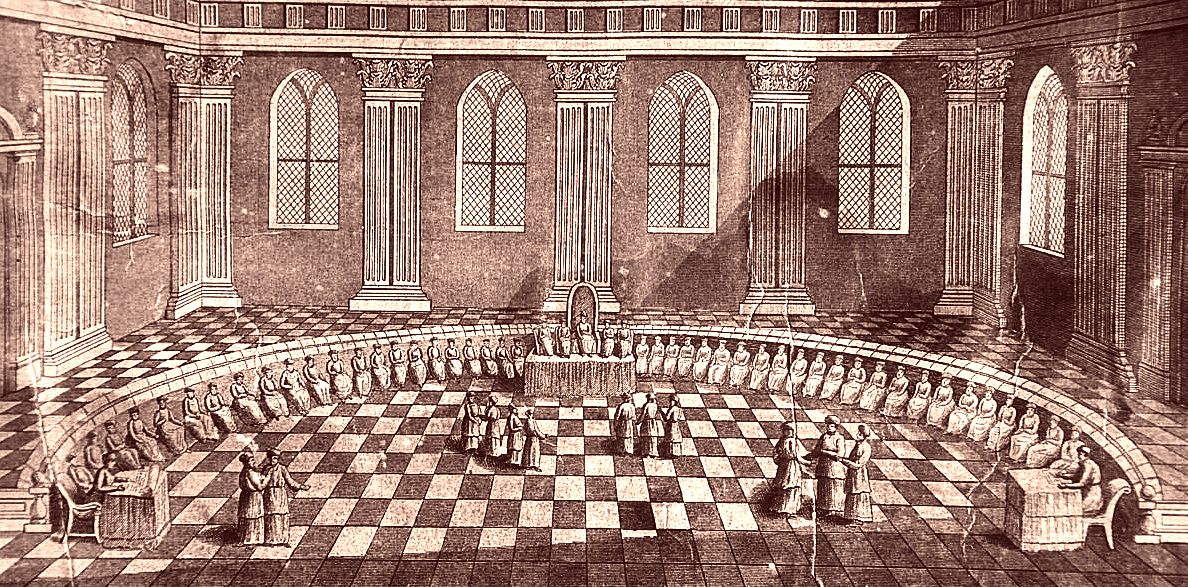
Illustration of the Hall of Hewn Stones, c. 1723–1730

The Hall of Hewn Stones (Hebrew: לִשְׁכַּת הַגָּזִית, romanized: liškaṯ haggāziṯ), also known as the Chamber of Hewn Stone, was the meeting place, or council-chamber, of the Sanhedrin during the Second Temple period (6th century BCE – 1st century CE). The Talmud deduces that it was built into the north wall of the Temple in Jerusalem, half inside the sanctuary and half outside, with doors providing access both to the temple and to the outside. The chamber is said to have resembled a basilica in appearance, having two entrances: one in the east and one in the west. Buildings in the temple complex used for ritual purposes had to be constructed of unhewn stones. (The Torah prohibits the use of hewn stones or those touched by iron for the altar per Ex 20:22, Deut 27:6. Various reasons have been given for the prohibition, among them: the purpose of the Temple is peace, while iron implements are used in war; the Temple lengthens human life while iron shortens it; the hewing of stones is an invitation to carving images in them, violating the prohibition against idolatry; and the sword references the earthly power of Esau, not the spiritual power of Jacob/Israel.)

According to the Talmud, the Hall of Hewn Stones is the traditional meeting place of the Great Sanhedrin when it functioned as a court with full sovereign powers including the power to impose criminal penalties.

It has been taught; R. Jose said; Originally there were not many disputes in Israel, but one Beth din of seventy-one members sat in the Hall of Hewn Stones, and two courts of twenty-three sat, one at the entrance of the Temple Mount and one at the door of the [Temple] Court, and other courts of twenty-three sat in all Jewish cities. If a matter of inquiry arose, the local Beth din was consulted. If they had a tradition [thereon] they stated it; if not, they went to the nearest Beth din. If they had a tradition thereon, they stated it, if not, they went to the Beth din situated at the entrance to the Temple Mount; if they had a tradition, they stated it; if not, they went to the one situated at the entrance of the Court, and he [who differed from his colleagues] declared, 'Thus have I expounded, and thus have my colleagues expounded; thus have I taught, and thus have they taught.' If they had a tradition thereon, they stated it, and if not, they all proceeded to the Hall of Hewn Stones, where they [i.e., the Great Sanhedrin] sat from the morning tamid until the evening tamid; on Sabbaths and festivals they sat within the hall.

— Babylonian Talmud, tractate Sanhedrin 88b

The Sanhedrin stopped meeting in the Hall of Hewn Stones when the Roman Empire restricted Judaea's autonomy and removed the Sanhedrin's power to impose criminal penalties.
