= Judah IV =

Judah IV (or Nesi'ah III) held the office of Nasi of the ancient Jewish Sanhedrin between 385 and 400 CE, following Gamaliel V. He was the son of Gamaliel V, and grandson of Hillel II. He was succeeded by Gamaliel VI, the last occupant of the office.

Beyond his name and the fact that he officiated during the last two decades of the fourth century, nothing is known of him. He is probably identical with the "Judah Nesi'ah" who addressed a question on Ruth 3:7 to the aggadist Pinchas bar Hama.

| Preceded by Gamaliel V | Nasi; 385–400 | Succeeded by Gamaliel VI |
