= Judah III =

Jewish sage (3rd-4th century CE)

Judah III (or Nesi'ah II; Hebrew: יהודה נשיאה ;יודן נשיאה), Yudan Nesiah, was a prominent Jewish sage, who held the office of Nasi of the ancient Jewish Sanhedrin between about 290 and 320 CE (fourth generation of amoraim).

== Biography ==
He was the son of Gamaliel IV, and grandson of Judah II.

It is often difficult to know when the Mishna and Talmud are referring to Judah II or Judah III; they do not clearly distinguish between them. Since the title "Nesi'ah" was borne by both, which of the two in any citation is meant by "Judah Nesi'ah" can be gathered only from internal evidence, especially from the names of the scholars mentioned in the context.

He was a pupil of R. Johanan bar Nappaha (d. 279). In a question regarding the time of the new moon, which he sent to Rav Ammi, he introduces a teaching taught to him by Johanan with the words: "Know that R. Johanan has taught us thus all his life long".

Judah III commissioned Johanan's pupils Ammi and Assi, who directed the Academy of Tiberias in the Land of Israel, after Eleazar ben Pedat's death, to organize the schools for children in the Palestinian cities. Ammi especially appears as his councilor in aggadic questions. He also visited the baths of Gadara with Ammi.

Ammi, however, protested against the number of fast-days which Judah set in times of trouble, saying that the community should not be overburdened. Once Helbo, a pupil of the above-mentioned Samuel ben Nahman, requested Judah, who had absented himself from a fast-day service held in the public square of the city, to take part in the service, which would thereby become more efficacious. The prominent amora Jeremiah is said to have reproached Judah in a letter for hating his friends and loving his enemies.

Germanus, Judah's Roman slave, is mentioned several times.

The most important event of Judah III's patriarchate was the visit of the emperor Diocletian to Palestine. One Friday the patriarch was called upon hurriedly to visit Diocletian at Caesarea Philippi, and his extraordinarily quick journey to there from Tiberias gave rise to a legend in which the aged Samuel ben Nahman appears. On the Church father Epiphanius' reference to the patriarch, see Grätz.

When Judah III died (c. 320), Hiyya bar Abba compelled his colleague Zeira, who was of priestly descent, to ignore, in honor of the dead patriarch, the laws to be observed by kohanim. This scene took place in the "synagogue of the vine" at Sepphoris; hence it is to be assumed that Judah III was buried at Sepphoris. He was succeeded by his son Hillel II.

Jewish tradition holds that Judah III was interred at Ovnit.

Preceded by Gamliel IV	Nasi; 290–320	Succeeded by Hillel II
