= Hillel II =

Amora and Nasi

Hillel II (Hebrew: הלל נשיאה, lit. 'Hillel the Nasi'), also known simply as Hillel, was an amora of the fifth generation in the Land of Israel. He held the office of Nasi of the Sanhedrin between 320 and 365 CE. He was the son and successor of Judah III. He is sometimes confused with Hillel the Elder, as the Talmud sometimes simply uses the name "Hillel".

== Biography ==
In two instances his name is quoted in connection with important decisions in Jewish law: in one, Jose ben Abin expounds to him a law; in the other, Hillel cites a mishnah to establish a law.

The emperor Julian the Apostate was gracious to Hillel, whom he honored on a number of occasions. In an autograph letter to him, Julian assured him of his friendship and promised to ameliorate further the condition of the Jews. Before setting out for the war with Persia, Julian addressed to the Jewish congregations a circular letter in which he informed them that he had "committed the Jewish tax-rolls to the flames," and that, "desiring to show them still greater favors, he has advised his brother, the venerable patriarch "Julos", to abolish what was called the 'send-tax'".

== Fixing of the calendar ==
He is traditionally regarded as the creator of the modern fixed Jewish calendar. This tradition first appears in a responsum of R. Hai Gaon (written in 992) cited by R. Abraham bar Hiyya in his Sefer Ha'ibbur (written in 1123). The citation explicitly refers to the year that this event happened, 670 of the Seleucid era, which corresponds to 358/9 CE.

However, a number of documents have been found that indicate the calendar was not fully fixed in Hillel's time; most famously a letter found in Cairo Geniza (from the year 835/6) indicates that the holidays were observed on different dates from those predicted by the current calendar. The calendar did not reach its exact modern form until at least the years 922–924. According to modern scholar Sacha Stern, Hai Gaon only attributed the establishment of a 19-year cycle, and not other details of the calendar, to Hillel.

The fixed calendar was of great benefit to Jews of his and subsequent generations. The Jewish calendar is lunisolar. That is, its months are synchronized with the phases of the moon, but its average year length approximates the mean length of a solar year. The Sanhedrin declared new months based on observations of the new moon, and added a 13th lunar month to certain years to ensure that holidays would continue to fall in the same seasons of the solar year. But Constantius II, following the precedents of Hadrian, prohibited the holding of such meetings as well as the vending of articles for distinctly Jewish purposes. The worldwide Jewish community depended on the calendar sanctioned by the Judean Sanhedrin to observe Jewish holidays on the correct dates. However, danger threatened the participants in that sanction and the messengers who communicated their decisions to distant congregations. Temporarily, to relieve the foreign congregations, Huna ben Abin once advised Rava not to wait for the official intercalation: "When you are convinced that the winter quarter will extend beyond the sixteenth day of Nisan declare the year a leap year, and do not hesitate". But as the religious persecutions continued, Hillel decided to provide an authorized calendar for all time to come, though by doing so he severed the ties which united the Jews of the diaspora to their mother country and to the patriarchate.

== In Christian tradition ==
According to Epiphanius of Salamis Hillel II was secretly baptized on his deathbed. The Christian convert Joseph of Tiberias was one of his disciples.

== See also ==
- Hillel the Elder
- Hebrew calendar

Preceded by Judah III	Nasi; 320–365	Succeeded by Gamliel V
