= Gamaliel VI =

Gamaliel VI (רבן גמליאל השישי; c. 370–425) was the last nasi of the ancient Sanhedrin.

Gamaliel came into office around the year 400. On October 20, 415, an edict issued by the Emperors Honorius and Theodosius II stripped Gamaliel of his rank of honorary prefect. This decree also banned him from building new synagogues, adjudicating disputes between Jews and Christians, converting non-Jews to Judaism, and owning Christian slaves.

Gamaliel probably died in 425, as the Codex Theodosianus mentions an edict from the year 426, which transformed the patriarch's tax into an imperial tax after the death of the patriarch. Theodosius did not allow the appointment of a successor and in 429 terminated the Jewish patriarchate.

Gamaliel appears to have been a physician. Marcellus Empiricus, a medical writer of the fifth century, mentioned that "for the spleen there is a special remedy which was recently demonstrated by the patriarch Gamaliel on the basis of approved experiments."

== Notes ==
Preceded by Judah IV	Nasi c. 400–425	Office abolished
