= Gamaliel V =

Gamaliel V held the office of Nasi of the ancient Jewish Sanhedrin between 365 and 385 CE. He was the son and successor of the Jewish patriarch Hillel II. He was notable for involving himself with perfecting the Jewish calendar in 359. He is apparently referred to in a letter written by Saint Jerome, in which Jerome states that Theodosius I (379-395) had condemned to death one Esychius, a former Roman consul who had stolen documents belonging to Gamaliel, who was furious about it.

Preceded by Hillel II	Nasi; 365–385	Succeeded by Judah IV
