= Judah II =

Jewish sage from the middle of the third century CE

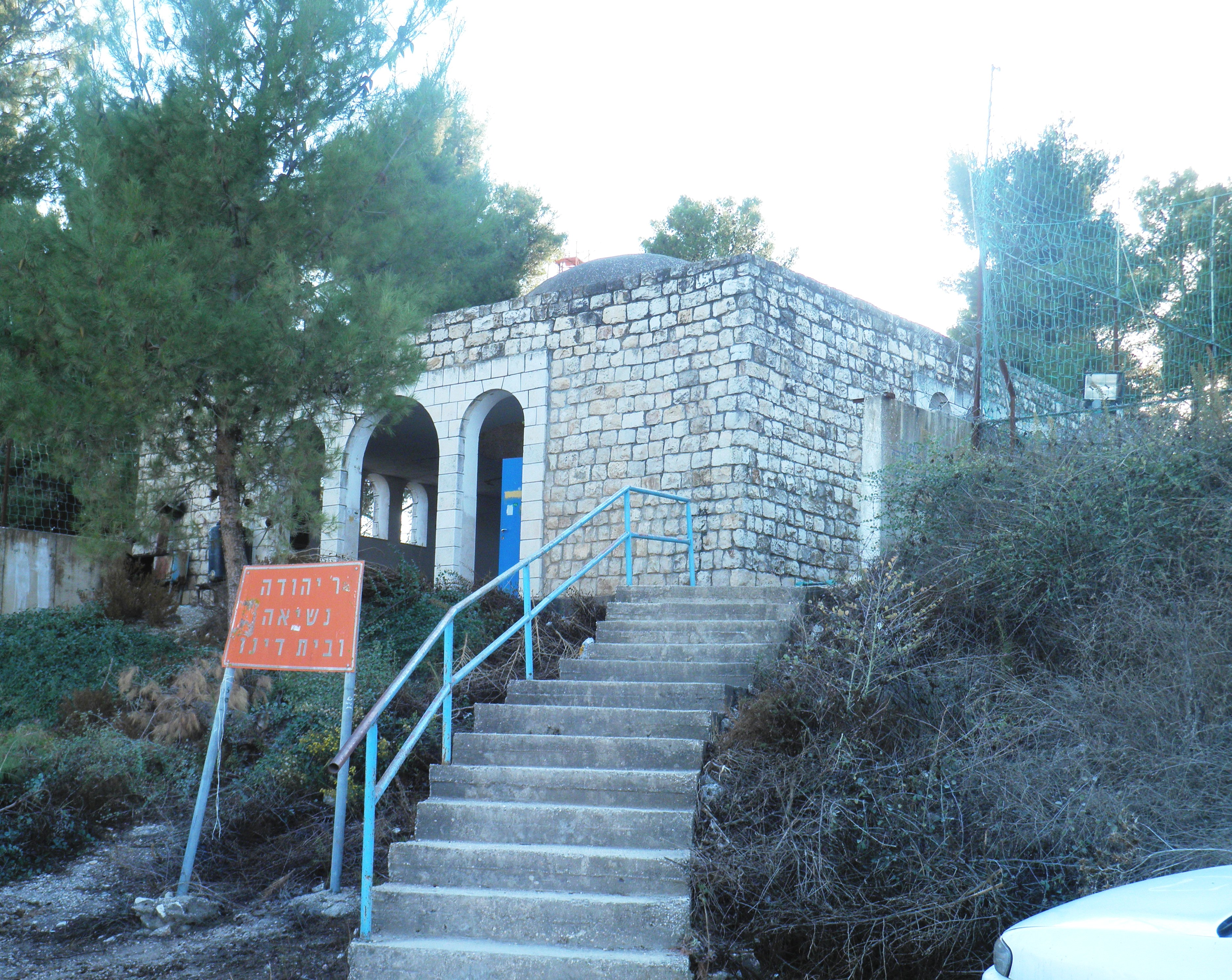
Tomb of Judah II and his court on Har Yavnit

Judah II or Nesi'ah I was a Jewish sage who lived in Tiberias in the Land of Israel, in the middle of the third century CE.

He is mentioned in the classical works of Judaism's Oral Torah, the Mishnah and Talmud. There he is variously called "Judah," "Judah Nesi'ah" (= "ha-Nasi"), and occasionally "Rabbi" like his grandfather, Judah haNasi. As Judah III is also designated as "Judah Nesi'ah," it is often difficult, sometimes impossible, to determine which one of these patriarchs is referred to.

== Biography ==
=== Youth ===
Various stories of Judah's youth, referring to him and his brother Hillel, have been preserved. As youths, Judah and Hillel visited Cabul and Biri, each time behaving in ways which offended the local population.

=== Relations with other scholars ===
He had especially friendly relations with Hoshaiah. Together with Rabbi Joshua ben Levi, he assisted at Laodicea in the reception of a female proselyte into Judaism. Jonathan b. Eleazar was his companion at the baths of Gadara. The relations between the patriarch and Rabbi Yochanan, the leader of the Academy of Tiberias, seem to have been friendly; Yochanan accepted the regular material support offered to him by Judah. Yochanan also induced Judah to visit Shimon ben Lakish, who had fled from Tiberias in consequence of having made offensive remarks in regard to the dignity of the patriarchate, and invite him to return.

On another occasion, it was Shimon ben Lakish who succeeded in softening Judah's indignation toward a daring preacher, Jose of Maon, who had denounced the rapacity of the patriarchal house. Shimon ben Lakish, moreover, seems to have exhorted the patriarch to unselfishness, saying "Take nothing, so that you will have to give nothing [to the Roman authorities]". Simeon ben Lakish also reminded Judah of the need of providing for elementary education in the various cities, referring to the saying, "A city in which there are no schools for children is doomed to destruction".

=== Standing among other scholars ===
Judah's authority as patriarch was not absolute: he could not carry out his intention of omitting the fast-day of Tisha B'Av when it fell on the Sabbath. He was not regarded by his contemporaries as their equal in scholarship, as appears from a curious meeting between him and R. Yannai.

However, Judah was not so unimportant as might appear from this, since Shimon ben Lakish (who was not his pupil) hands down a whole series of halakhic teachings in the name of "Judah Nesi'ah". Shimon ben Lakish doubtless survived Judah and repeated his traditions. Shimon handed down also some of Judah's aggadic teachings. The passage (Nazir 20c) referring to Simeon ben Lakish as "sitting before Judah" and explaining a midrash does not refer to him as a pupil, but as a member of the college. This view is supported by Avodah Zarah 6b, which speaks of Shimon as "sitting before Judah Nesi'ah"; here the patriarch asks Shimon what to do in a certain case, and Shimon clearly appears as the better halakhist, not as Judah's pupil.

Judah's relations to the scholars of his time appear from the following disagreement between Judah and the rabbis: "One said: 'The time is adapted to the leader [parnas]'; the other said: 'The leader is adapted to the time'". It was probably Judah who said that the leader is adapted to the time, and that he must not be blamed for his own incapacity. In the above-mentioned meeting between Judah and Jose of Maon it was Jose who said, "As the time, so the prince."

On another occasion, Judah openly confessed his incapacity. Once during a drought he had ordered a fast and prayed in vain for rain. Thereupon he said, "What a difference between Samuel of Ramah and Judah, the son of Gamaliel! Woe to the time which has such a tent-peg, and woe to me that I have come at such a time!" Rain soon fell in consequence of this self-abasement.

=== Relations with Origen ===
Grätz identifies Judah's brother Hillel, with the "patriarch Joullos" ('Ιοῦλλος πατριάρχης), with whom Origen conversed at Caesarea on Biblical subjects. But as Hillel himself was not a patriarch, it may be assumed that it was Judah who conversed with Origen. Origen probably misread ΙΟϒΛΟΣ (Joulos) for ΙΟϒΔΑΣ (Joudas). This assumption agrees with the above-mentioned statement about Hoshaiah's close relations with the patriarch, for it may be assumed as a fact that Hoshaiah had contact with Origen at Caesarea.

== Teachings ==
In halakhic tradition, Judah II was especially known by three ordinances decreed by him and his academy; one of these ordinances referred to a reform of the divorce laws. Especially famous was the decree permitting the use of oil prepared by pagans, incorporated in the Mishnah with the same formula used in connection with decrees of Judah haNasi—"Rabbi and his court permitted". This ordinance, which abrogated an old law, was recognized as authoritative in Babylonia by Samuel, and subsequently by Rav, who at first hesitated to accept it. Simlai, the famous aggadist, tried to induce Judah to abrogate also the prohibition against using bread prepared by pagans. Judah, however, refused to do so, alleging that he did not wish his academy to be called the "losing court".

=== Quotes ===
- If not for the breath of children in the house of their schoolmaster, the world could not exist.

== See also ==
- Judah I — 5th generation tannaic sage.
- Judah III — 4th generation amoraic sage.
- Judah IV — 6th generation amoraic sage.

Preceded by Gamliel III	Nasi; Judah II; 230–270	Succeeded by Gamliel IV
