= Bayhaqi =

Bayhaqi (meaning "from Bayhaq") is a surname. Notable people with the surname include:

- Ahmad Bayhaqi (994–1066), Persian Islamic scholar
- Abolfazl Beyhaqi (995–1077), Persian secretary, historian, and author
- Abu'l-Hasan Bayhaqi (c. 1097–1169), Iranian historian and polymath
