= Gamaliel IV =

3rd century rabbi and nasi

Gamaliel IV (flourished probably late 3rd century CE; also known as Gamaliel IV ben Judah II) was the son of the nasi Judah II and father of Judah III.

Gamaliel was the president of the Sanhedrin between 270 and 290 CE. However, due to Roman persecution, during his presidency the name Sanhedrin was dropped and its authoritative decisions were subsequently issued under the name Beth HaMidrash. His name is rarely mentioned in the Talmud, as his scholarship was considered inferior to that of his contemporary Rabbi Yochanan.

Hoshaiah Rabbah is said to have prevented Gamaliel from introducing into Syria a ruling referring to the tithing of crops. The Jerusalem Talmud tells a story of Gamaliel's humility: Once when Abbahu asked him a question about the law, Gamaliel speaks of his own ignorance in comparison with Abbahu.

Preceded by Judah II	Nasi; 270–290	Succeeded by Judah III
