= Nasi (Hebrew title) =

Hebrew title

Nasi (Hebrew: נָשִׂיא, romanized: nāśī) is a title meaning "prince" in Biblical Hebrew, "Prince [of the Sanhedrin]" in Mishnaic Hebrew. Certain great figures from Jewish history have the title, including Judah ha-Nasi, who was the chief redactor of the Mishnah as well as nasi of the Sanhedrin.

In Modern Hebrew, its meaning has changed to "president".

== Usage ==
=== Genesis and ancient Israel ===
The noun nasi (including its grammatical variations) occurs 132 times in the Masoretic Text of the Hebrew Bible and is usually translated "prince", or occasionally "captain." The first use is for the twelve "princes" who will descend from Ishmael, in the Book of Genesis (Lech-Lecha, Genesis 17:20), and the second use (in Chayei Sarah Genesis 23:6), is the Hittites recognising Abraham as "a godly prince" (נְשִׂיא אֱלֹהִים nǝśi ʾǝlohim).

In the Book of Leviticus (Vayikra, Leviticus 4:22–26), in the rites of sacrifices for leaders who err, there is the special offering made by a nasi.

In the Book of Numbers (Naso Numbers 7), the leader of each tribe is referred to as a nasi, and each one brings a gift to the Tabernacle. In Numbers 34:16–29, occurring 38 years later in the Biblical story, the nǝśiʾim (נְשִׂיאִים, plural) of each tribe are listed again, as the leaders responsible for apportioning tribal inheritances.

Later in the history of ancient Israel, the title of nasi was given to the Kings of Judah (Ezekiel 44:2–18; Ezra 1:8). Similarly, the Mishnah defines the nasi of Leviticus 4 to mean the king.

=== Second Temple period ===
During the Second Temple period (c. 530 BCE – 70 CE), the nasi was the highest-ranking member and leader of the Sanhedrin (סַנְהֶדְרִין from Koine Greek: Συνέδριον, romanized: sunédrion, lit. 'council'), including when it sat as a criminal court. The position was created in c. 191 BCE when the Sanhedrin lost confidence in the ability of the High Priest of Israel to serve as its head.

In the time of the Roman Republic, the Romans recognized the nasi as Patriarch of the Jews and required all Jews to pay him a tax for the upkeep of that office, which ranked highly in the Roman official hierarchy.

After the Siege of Jerusalem (70 CE), in the time of the destruction of the Temple in Jerusalem and the Jewish diaspora, the office of nasi in Palestine was comparable with the office of exilarch in Mesopotamia.

=== Late Roman empire ===
This position as patriarch or head of court was reestablished several years after the Bar Kokhba revolt. This made the nasi a power which both Jews and Romans respected. The Jewish community in Mesopotamia, referred to by the Jews as Babylonia, also recognized him. The nasi had leadership and served as a political representative to the authorities while the religious leadership was led by Torah scholars. The Nasi was recognized under Roman law as the supreme authority in Jewish affairs, and ranked even higher in status than the governor of Palestina Secunda, the former vir illustris and the latter vir clarissimus. The nasi had the power to appoint and suspend communal leaders inside and outside of Israel, including cities in Arabia, Phoenicia, and Syria.

The Romans respected the nasi and gave extra land and the power of taxation. Under Jewish law, the intercalary thirteenth month in the Hebrew calendar, Adar Bet, was announced by the nasi.

The last nasi of the Judean Sanhedrin was Gamaliel VI (d. 425); the Byzantine Empire subsequently issued an edict recorded in the legal code of the Codex Theodosianus of 426 that transformed the nasi tax into an imperial tax deposited into the Aerarium, or Roman treasury.

=== Middle Ages ===
The term nasi was later applied to those who held high offices in the Jewish community, and Jews who held prominence in the courts of non-Jewish rulers. The nasi were also prevalent during the 8th-century Frankish kingdom. They were a highly privileged group in Carolingian France. The Jews of Narbonne collaborated with Pepin the Short to end Muslim rule over their city in 759. The Jews accepted surrender and Pepin was able to hold off the Saracens in the Iberian peninsula. Pepin rewarded the Jews with land and privileges such as the right to judicial and religious autonomy. The heirs of the king and nasi held a close relationship until the tenth century.

=== 17th–20th-century Jewish community in Yemen ===
According to ethnologist Erich Brauer, among the Jews of Yemen, the title of nasi was conferred upon a man belonging to the community's most noble and richest family. There was no direct election for this post. In general, the nasi was also a scholar, well-versed in Torah, but this was not a condition for his office. Among his duties, he was a representative of the community in all its affairs before the government. He was also entrusted with the duty of collecting the annual jizya or poll-tax, as well as settling disputes arising between members of the community.

=== Chabad ===
The term nasi was used by Menachem Mendel Schneerson to refer to the spiritual leaders of Chabad. In particular, he used the term Nesi Hador (נשיא הדור; "prince of the generation") or Nesi doreinu (נשיא דורנו; "prince of our generation") to refer to his father-in-law, Yosef Yitzchak Schneersohn.

=== Modern Hebrew ===
In Modern Hebrew, nasi means "president", and is not used in its classical sense. The word nasi is used, in Israel, as the title of the President of Israel and the Chief Justice of the Supreme Court of Israel. In Hebrew, the word "prince" is now expressed by a synonym: nasi (as in Yehuda HaNasi) and nasīkh (נָסִיך).

Much more recently, Adin Steinsaltz took the title nasi in an attempt to reestablish the Sanhedrin in its judicial capacity as the supreme court of Judaism.

== List of Nesi'im ==
During the Mishnaic period, the office of nasi was filled as follows:

Nasi	Term in office	
Yose ben Yoezer	170 BCE	140 BCE
Joshua ben Perachyah	140 BCE	100 BCE
Judah ben Tabbai (who later absconded)	110 BCE	ca. 80 BCE
Simeon ben Shetach	ca. 80 BCE	60 BCE
Sh'maya	65 BCE	c. 31 BCE
Hillel the Elder	c. 31 BCE	9 CE
Shimon ben Hillel	9	9
Rabban Gamaliel the Elder	30	50
Rabban Shimon ben Gamliel	50	70
Rabban Yohanan ben Zakai	70	80
Rabban Gamaliel II of Yavne	80	118
Rabbi Eleazar ben Azariah	118	120
Interregnum (Bar Kokhba revolt)	120	142
Rabban Shimon ben Gamliel II	142	165
Rabbi Judah I haNasi	165	220
Gamaliel III	220	230
Judah II Nesi'ah	230	270
Gamaliel IV	270	290
Judah III Nesi'ah	290	320
Hillel II	320	365
Gamaliel V	365	385
Judah IV	385	400
Gamaliel VI	c. 400	425

List of presidents of Israel:

President	Term in office	
Chaim Weizmann	1949	1951
Yitzhak Ben-Zvi	1952	1963
Zalman Shazar	1963	1973
Ephraim Katzir	1973	1978
Yitzhak Navon	1978	1983
Chaim Herzog	1983	1993
Ezer Weizman	1993	2000
Moshe Katsav	2000	2007
Shimon Peres	2007	2014
Reuven Rivlin	2014	2021
Isaac Herzog	2021	incumbent

== Rabban ==
Rabban was a higher title than rabbi and was given to the nasi starting with Gamaliel the Elder.

The title rabban was restricted in usage to the descendants of Hillel the Elder, the sole exception being Rabban Yochanan ben Zakai (c. 30–90 CE), the leader in Jerusalem during the Siege of Jerusalem in 70 CE and who safeguarded the future of the Jewish people after the Great Revolt by pleading with the Emperor Vespasian.

Rabbi Eleazar ben Azariah, who was nasi between 118 and 120 CE, was not given the title rabban, perhaps because he only occupied the office of nasi for a short while, after which it reverted to the descendants of Hillel.

Prior to Rabban Gamaliel the Elder, no titles were used before anyone's name, in line with the Talmudic adage "Gadol miRabban shmo" ("Greater than the title rabban is a person's own name"). For this reason, Hillel the Elder has no title before his name: his name is in itself a title. Similarly, Moses and Abraham have no titles before their names, but an epithet is sometimes used to differentiate between biblical and historic personages, hence Avraham Avinu (Abraham 'Our Father') and Moshe Rabbeinu (Moses 'Our Teacher').

Starting with Rabbi Judah I haNasi (born 135 CE), not even the nasi was given the title rabban. In its place, Judah haNasi was given the lofty accolade Rabbeinu HaKadosh ('Our Holy Teacher').

== See also ==
- Modern attempts to revive the Sanhedrin
