= Gamaliel III =

3rd century Judean rabbi and nasi

Gamaliel III (Hebrew: רבן גמליאל ברבי, read as Rabban Gamaliel beRabbi, that is: son of Rebbi, after his father Judah haNasi) was a 3rd-century rabbi (first generation of amoraim).

His father appointed him his successor as nasi. Little certain is known about his activities, but it is likely that the revision of the Mishnah was completed during his era.

He was the father of Judah II and Hillel (not to be mistaken with Hillel the Elder), and the brother of Shimon ben Judah HaNasi.

== Teachings ==
The Tosefta contains but one saying of Gamaliel, a paraphrase of Numbers 11:22, in which Moses complains of the unreasonableness of the people's wishes. A baraita contains a halakhic exegesis by him. R. Hoshaiah asks Gamaliel's son, Judah II, concerning a halakhic opinion of his father's. Rabbi Yohanan tells of a question which Gamaliel answered for him. Samuel of Nehardea tells of differences of opinion between Gamaliel and other scholars.

=== Quotes ===
- "Good is the study of the Law (Torah) with a worldly profession, for the toil of them both causes sin to be forgotten. Ultimately, all Torah study that is not accompanied with work is destined to cease and to cause sin."
- "Those who work for the community should do so for the sake of heaven (i.e. in an altruistic manner), for then the merit of their ancestors shall aid them, and their righteousness shall endure forever. But, as for you, I will ascribe unto you an ample award, as if you had done it yourselves."
- "Be careful of those in authority, for they will let a person near to them only for their own purposes; they act like friends when it is to their advantage, and will not stand by someone in their hour of need."
- "Make that His will should be your will, so that He should make your will to be as His will. Nullify your will before His will, so that He should nullify the will of others before your will."
- "Anyone who has compassion on G-d's creatures will receive compassion from Heaven, and anyone who does not have compassion for G-d's creatures will not receive compassion from Heaven."

Preceded by Yehuda HaNasi	Nasi; 220–230	Succeeded by Judah II
