= Architecture of Palestine =

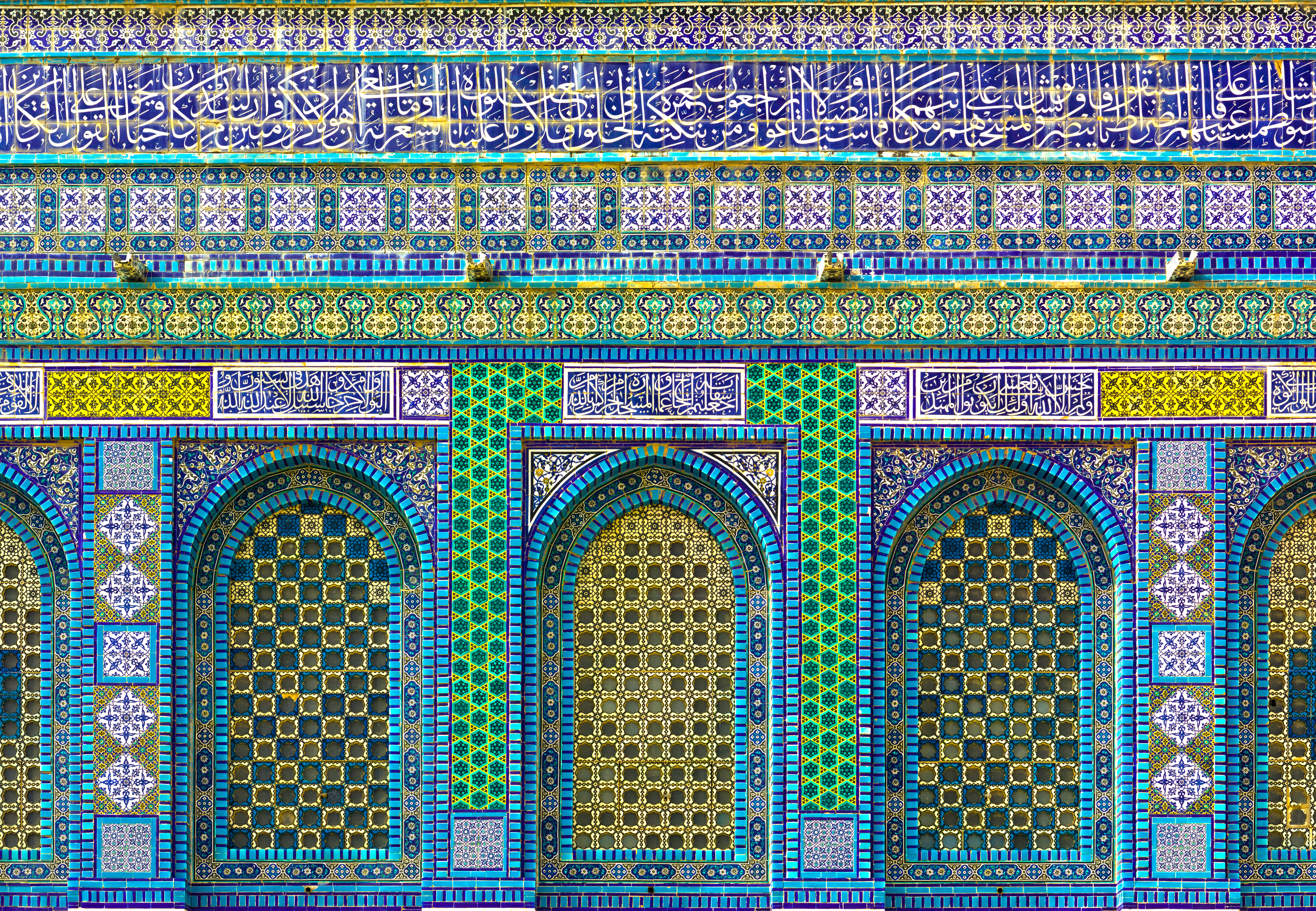
The Dome of the Rock in Jerusalem

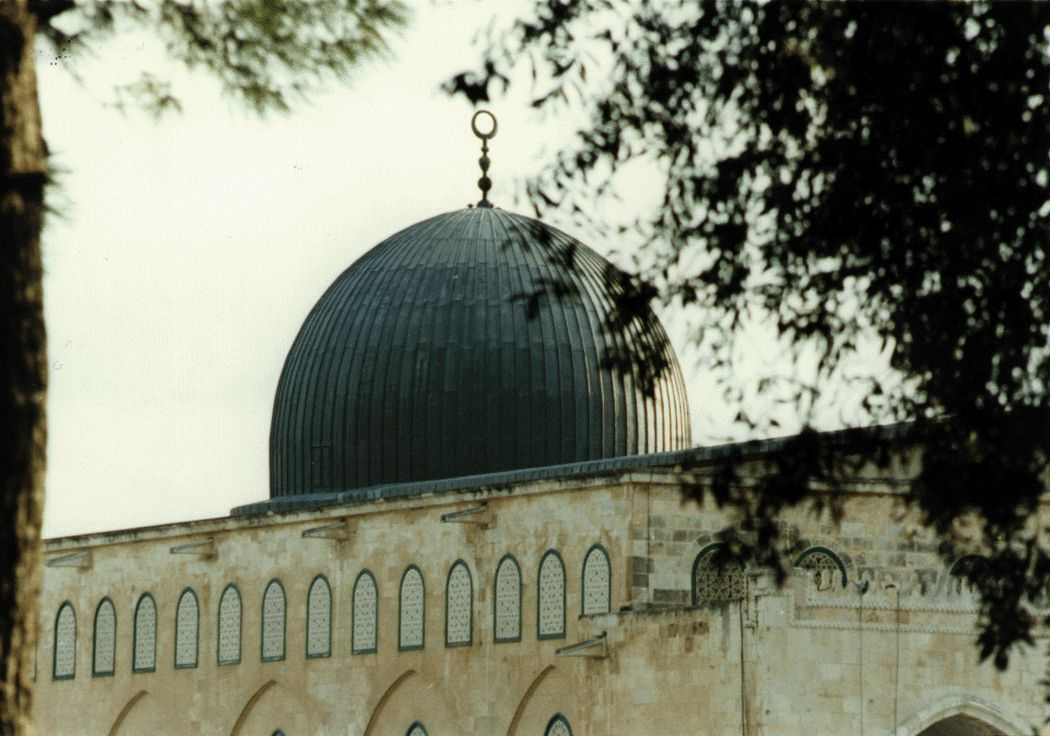
Al-Aqsa Mosque in Jerusalem

The architecture of Palestine covers a vast historical time frame and a number of different styles and influences over the ages. The urban architecture of the region of Palestine prior to 1850 was relatively sophisticated. While it belonged to greater geographical and cultural context of the Levant and the Arab world, it constituted a distinct tradition, "significantly different from the traditions of Syria, Jordan, Lebanon and Egypt." Nonetheless Palestinian townhouse shared in the same basic conceptions regarding the arrangement of living space and apartment types commonly seen throughout the Eastern Mediterranean. The rich diversity and underlying unity of the architectural culture of this wider region stretching from the Balkans to North Africa was a function of the exchange fostered by the caravans of the trade routes, and the extension of Ottoman rule over most of this area, beginning in the early 16th century through until the end of World War I.

== History ==
=== Ancient architecture ===
Archaeological artifacts imparting information as to the nature of monumental construction, such as city walls, palaces, tomb and cult centers, in ancient Palestine are abundant. The paucity of written records, and the incompleteness of archaeological remains of ancient Palestinian housing available to early scholars, resulted in biblical archaeologists often looking to modern Palestinian houses to try to imagine how ancient housing in Palestine was constructed in biblical times. Cautioning against the conclusiveness of such comparisons, H. Keith Beebe writes that, "Arab houses are structured with regard to specific social customs and economic conditions, different from those of ancient Palestine." Beebe notes that a full account of the architectural details of ancient Palestinian housing is rarely possible, but that written records and archaeological findings available to scholars at his time of writing (1968), provide "a quite reliable picture of houses in the common life of ancient Palestine."

Excavations in Beidha in modern-day Jordan indicate that the earliest Palestinian houses were constructed about 9,000 years ago. Consisting of stone foundations with a superstructure made of mud-brick, they were simple structures, most often not more than one room with a single doorway, and likely without windows. Four different floor plans preserved from this time period have been identified: multagonal circular, true circular, square, and rectangular. Roofs were normally made of wooden supports upon which woven reed mats or brush were laid atop of which were added layers of clay mortar, rolled smooth to make an impermeable surface. Many of these early houses contained burial chambers beneath the floor. Food was prepared outside the house where the storage silos were also located. Houses were grouped closely together, and sometimes shared a back or side wall in common.

Among the foundations discovered in the Beidha excavations were those of a six-sided, one room house dated to 6800 BCE. Circular house foundations in Beidha dating to about 6000 BCE resembled those found at pre-Pottery Neolithic A Jericho. The floors of the Jericho round houses differed in that they were sunken beneath ground level, with wooden steps leading down into the house. This sunken feature is interpreted as a sign of continuous occupation of these houses over a long period of time. By 5000 BCE, the houses in Jericho were of a rectangular shape, with more than one room. These rooms had straight walls, but with rounded corners that may be a remnant of the prior round house building tradition. Some of the doorframes were reinforced by timber, perhaps to reduce the wear and tear to the mud-brick structure that would be incurred from constant human contact. The floors were covered with hard lime plaster, extending up the walls. By this time, water and grain storage had moved to house interiors, while thick layers of charcoal uncovered in house courtyards indicate that food preparations were carried out there.

=== Classical Antiquity ===
Five types of housing are seen in the Roman-Byzantine period. Two of these, the simple house and the courtyard house, typify the domestic architecture of Palestine for some three millennia into the modern age (see section on Building materials and techniques). The other three, seen as characteristic of the Roman-Byzantine period, are the big mansion (domus), the farmhouse and the shop-house. The relatively high number of domus structures dated to the late Hellenistic and Roman periods reveal the extent of Greco-Roman influence on domestic architecture in Palestine at that time. The oldest known examples of this kind of structure in the Galilee were situated in Philoteria/Bet Yerah and date to the late Hellenistic period. Examples of the farmhouse type found thus far date exclusively to the Herodian period.

Architectural remains from the early Christian period are scant in Palestine. Scholars like Walter E. Rast attribute this to the relative powerlessness of the early Christian communities prior to the institutionalization of the Christian church. The earliest known building from this period, a church built in octagonal form, dates to the 2nd or 3rd centuries CE. While there is evidence that Christians venerated a number of sites associated with Jesus at this early time, very few structures have been found that were constructed at this time. One notable exception is evidence of a pre-4th century CE structure that was found under the mosaics of the Church of the Nativity in Bethlehem.

=== Arab caliphate period (640–1099) ===
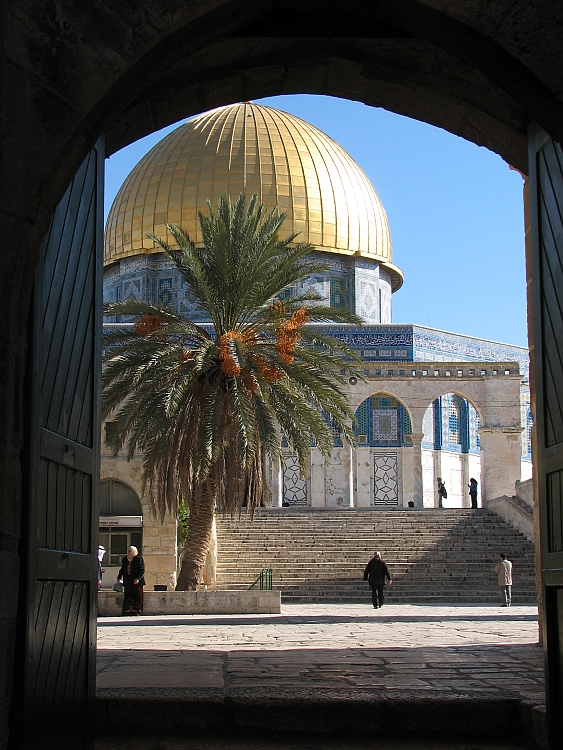
Dome of the Rock viewed through the Old City's Cotton Gate (Bab al-Qattanin)

Major changes to the monumental architecture of Palestine followed the Arab Islamic conquest of the region in 637 CE. The Roman and Byzantine churches, predominant features in many towns and villages in Palestine over the previous six centuries, were quickly joined by mosques, though the construction of churches continued. Much of the construction in this period was centered in Jerusalem. One of the most famous early monuments expressing the new role of Islam in the region was the Dome of the Rock (Qabbat as-Sakhra). Dedicated in 692 CE, the structure was built over the rock where Islamic tradition holds Abraham acceded to God's request that he sacrifice his son. The Al-Aqsa mosque, built shortly thereafter, was reconstructed many times since with its form today deriving from a renovation carried out during the Crusader period in Palestine.

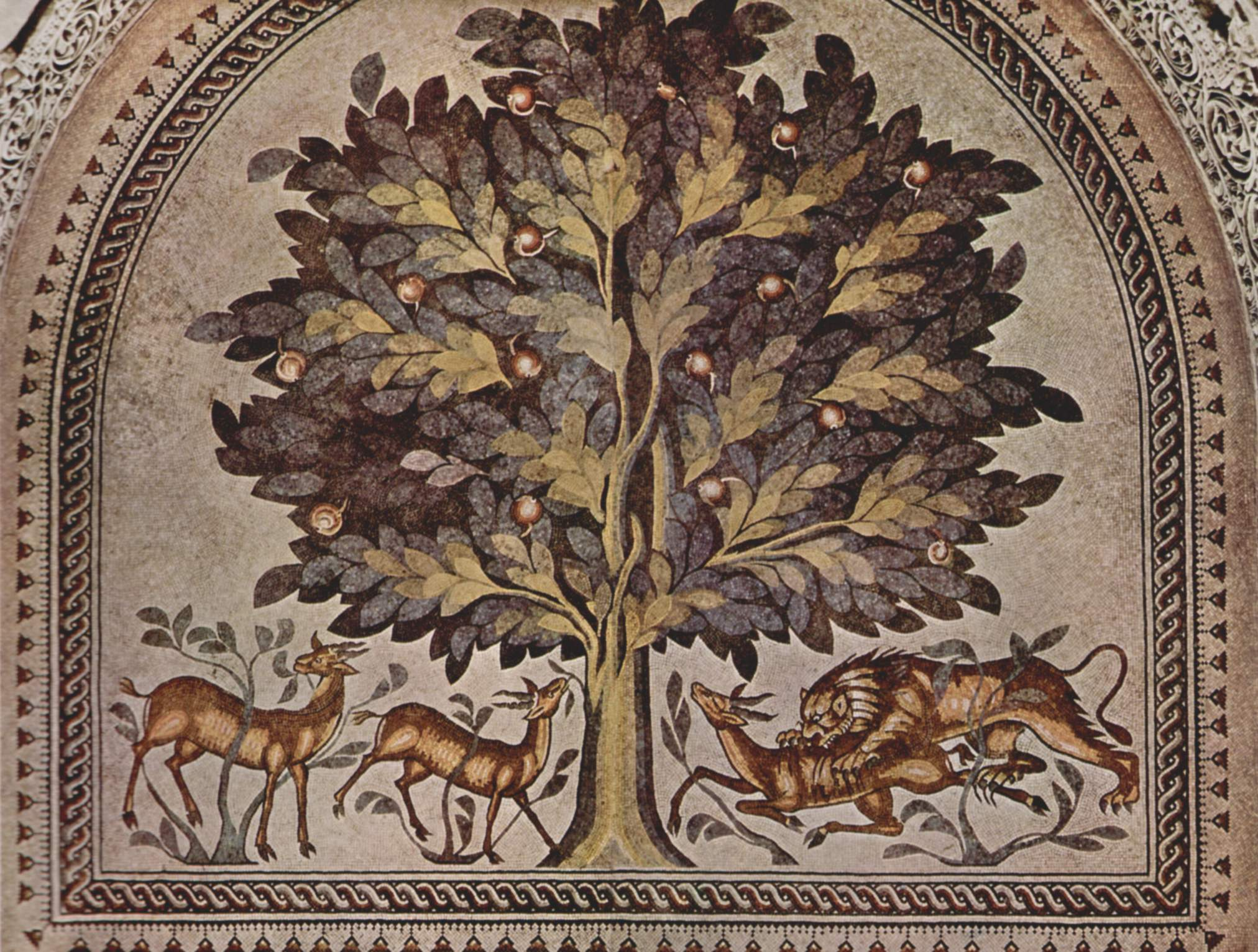
An Arabic Umayyad mosaic from Khirbat al-Mafjar in Jericho

While these buildings and the construction of the Royal Palace established Jerusalem as a religious and cultural centre of Islam, the administrative capital of the Umayyad and Abbasid caliphates was Ramla, a new town established in the years following the Arab conquest. The White Mosque was built in that city by the caliph Sulayman ibn Abd al-Malik in 715–717 and was completed by his successor Umar II by 720.

Archaeological finds indicate that the major cities of the Byzantine period (Lydda, Bisan, Tiberias, Gaza, Caesarea, and Acre continued to be occupied in this period and a number of new settlements were built outside the cities and in the Negev as well. Of these, some were agricultural centres while others were palaces or summer resorts for the elite. Examples include palace of Khirbat al-Mafjar, also known locally as Hisham's Palace, outside Jericho and Khirbat al-Minya near Tiberias. Khirbat al-Mafjar is described as, "the most elaborate palace of the period [...] in the state of Palestine." A statue of the Caliph al-Walid II, who likely commissioned its construction between 743 and 748, stands at the entrance to the palatial baths. The architectural form and detailing exhibit a melange of Sassanian and Syrian styles. One of the earliest Umayyad palaces was known as Al-Sinnabra and served as a winter resort to Mu'awiya, Marwan I, and other caliphs in Umayyad-era Palestine (c. 650–704 CE). The ruins of al-Sinnabra were initially misidentified as belonging to the Byzantine-Roman period; it and other sites in the process of being similarly re-dated are said by archaeologists to indicate an architectural continuity between the Roman and early Arab empires.

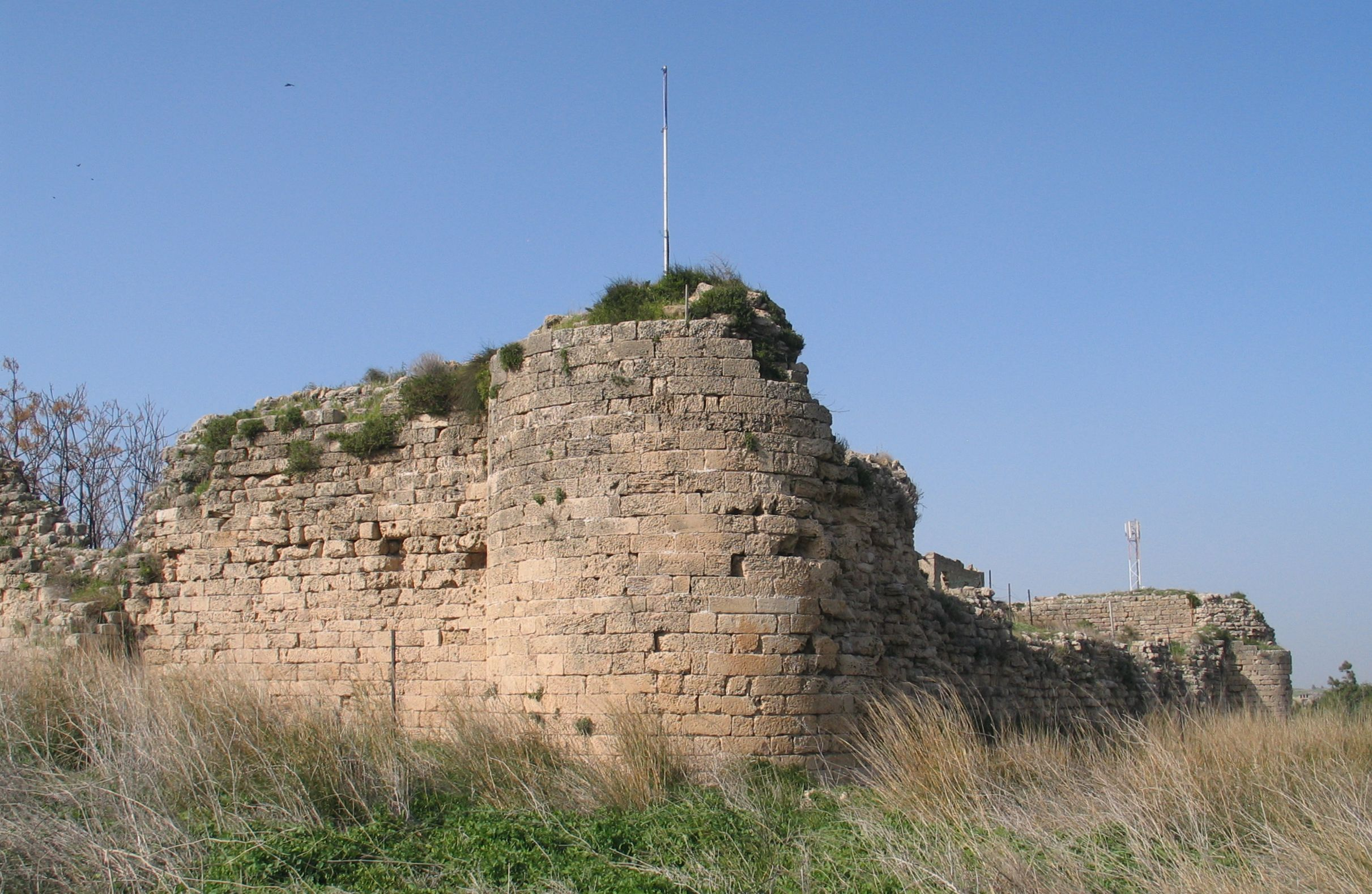
The ruins of the fort at Kfar Lam

Monumental construction was rarer during the later Abbasid and Fatimid dynasties due to increasing political fragmentation. Palestinian stonework had already established a reputation for fluency and innovation. Two large monuments that can be dated to the 10th and 11th centuries are fortified structures designed to guard against Byzantine invasion. The ruins of Kfar Lam, a fort made up of rectangular enclosures built of thin slabs of kurkar stone with solid corner towers and semi-circular buttresses, can still be seen today, though the village of the same name was depopulated during the 1948 Palestine war. Another fort at Ashdod is of the same basic construction but includes a line of marble columns in the centre that were taken from a nearby Classical site. Just outside that fort lie the remains of a building topped with a dome that had holes cut into it to let in the light which is thought to have served as a bathhouse.

=== Crusader period (1099–1291) ===
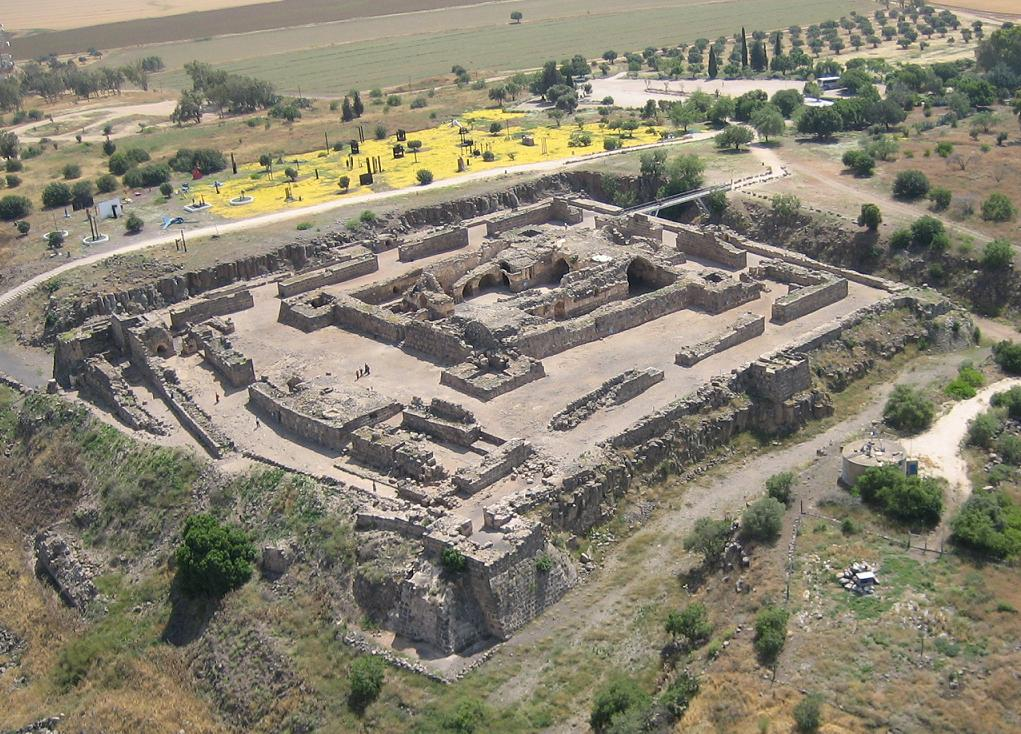
The Belvoir fortress, or Kawkab al-Hawa

The most well-known architectural legacy left by the Crusaders were the fortified castles built in prominent positions throughout Palestine. A typical Crusader castle consisted of a square or rectangular tower surrounded by irregular enclosure walls that followed the shape of the land and famous castles include those of Belvoir and Monfort.

Another major focus of the Crusader building effort were churches. Hundreds of churches were constructed during the Crusader period in Palestine, with 60 built in Jerusalem alone. Some of these were built on the ruins of earlier Byzantine churches; in other cases, mosques were transformed into churches. The Dome of the Rock was converted into a church given in the care of the Augustinians, while Al-Aqsa mosque was transformed into a palace by Baldwin I. Fine carved capitals and sculpture were a feature of the Crusader churches. After Jerusalem was reconquered by the Ayyubids in 1187, the Crusader presence in Palestine shrank to be centered around Acre where some of the finest Crusader architecture was built until their final defeat by the Mamluks there in 1291.

The influence of Crusader architecture on the Islamic architecture of Palestine that followed was both direct and indirect. The direct influence can be seen in the cushion-shaped voussoirs and folded cross-vaults that were adapted for use in the Mamluk buildings of Jerusalem. Additionally, Arab castles constructed following the Crusades, like the later phases of the Ajlun Castle (Qa'lat Rabad) and Nimrod Castle (Qa'lat Namrud), adopted the irregular shapes introduced by the Crusaders. The influence could even be seen in religious architecture, such that the minaret of the Great Mosque in Ramla bears a striking resemblance to a Crusader tower. The indirect influence manifested in the development of the counter-Crusade which saw propaganda incorporated into the architecture, specifically via the use of monumental inscriptions and carved elements. For example, on the Baybars Bridge outside Lod, the lion of Baybars, the famous Mamluk leader and warrior, can be seen catching a mouse.

=== Mamluk period (1250–1517) ===
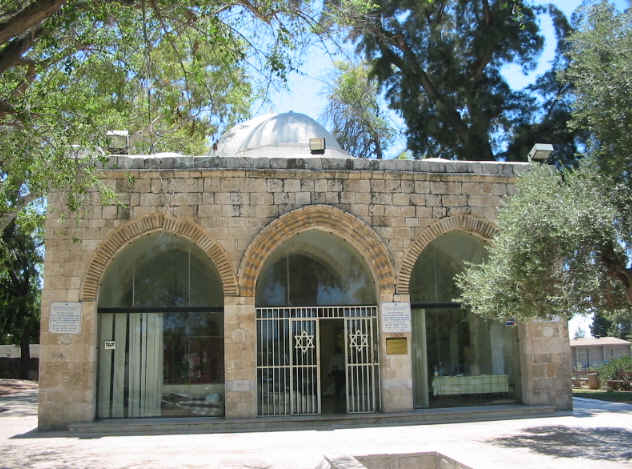
Mausoleum of Abu Huraira, in Yibna

The Mamluks focused on revitalizing the road network, which was essential to their postal system in Palestine. Numerous bridges and khans were built, some of which constituted larger compounds complete with a mosque and minaret. An impressive example of one of these larger khan compounds can be seen in Khan Yunis in the Gaza Strip. Some of the Mamluk bridges also remain standing, such as Jisr Jindas ("Jindas Bridge") which is flanked by two lions and sports Arabic inscriptions.

Also under Mamluk rule, the construction of religious buildings such as madrassas, mosques, khanqahs and commemorative mausoleums proliferated in Palestine and these constitute some the finest examples of medieval architecture in the Middle East. Mamluk architecture in Jerusalem was characterized by the use of joggled voussoirs, ablaq masonry, muqarnas mouldings, and multi-coloured marble inlay.

In Ramla, the Crusader church was converted into a mosque and the Great Mosque there was rebuilt. One of the most beautiful Mamluk era structures is the tomb of Abu Hurayra in Yibna. With a triple-domed portico, the central area is also covered with a dome set on squinches. Decoration is restricted to the mihrab and doorway which are covered in inlaid marble and inscriptions.

=== Ottoman period (1516–1918) ===
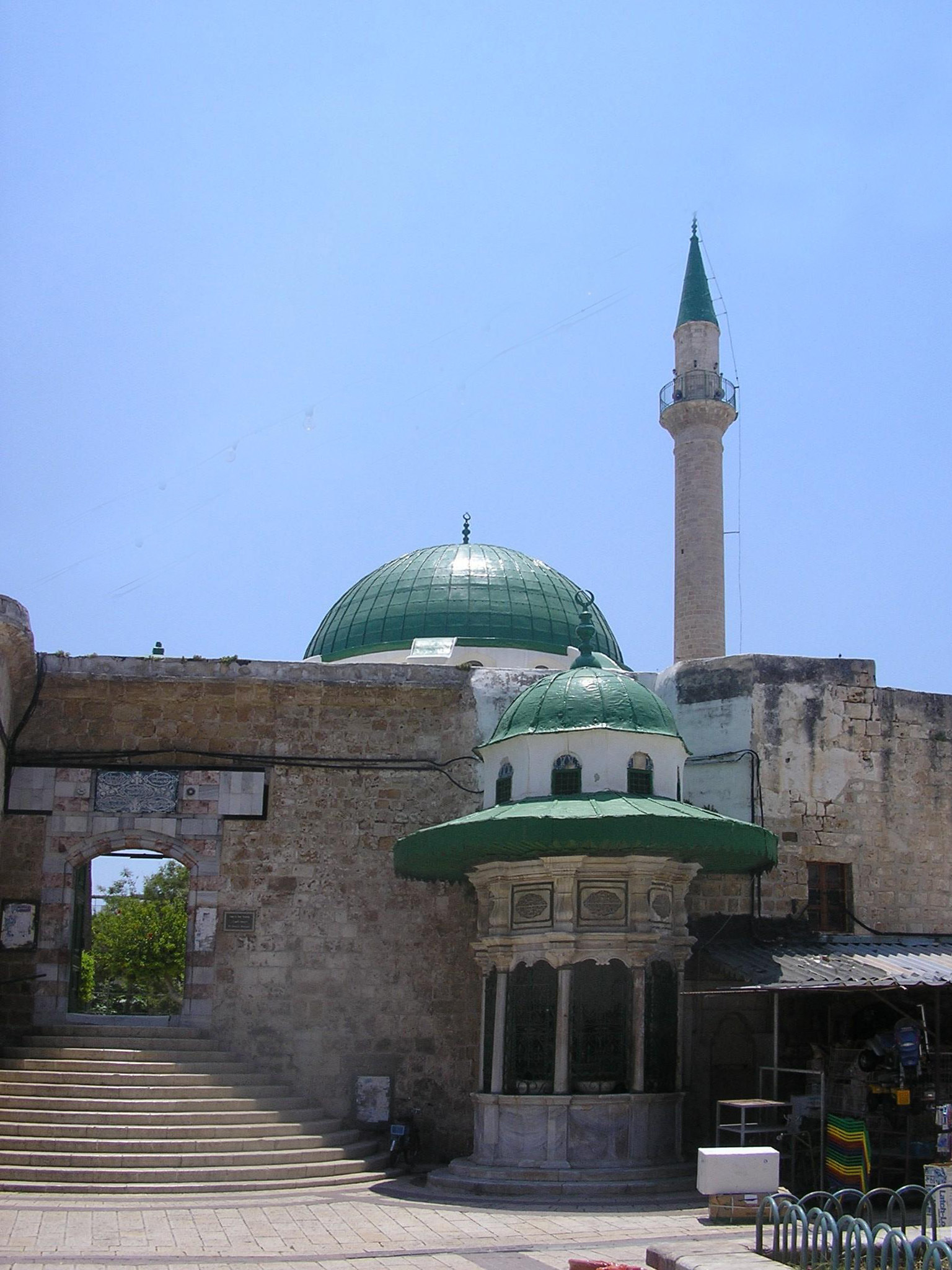
Entrance to the el-Jazzar Mosque, with the sabil to the right of the steps

New architectural techniques introduced by the Ottoman rulers were gradually adopted, though not universally. Jerusalem was redeveloped under Ottoman rule, its walls rebuilt, the Dome of the Rock was redecorated with tiles, and the water system renovated. Acre also underwent a massive renovation during this time and it is the best example of urban Ottoman architecture in Palestine with several khans, two bath houses, three main souqs, at least ten mosques and a citadel. The el-Jazzar Mosque is particularly impressive with its pencil-like minaret and large central dome. Hammam al-Basha features fine decorative detailing in the form of Armenian tilework and inlaid marble floors. Houses in Acre built during this period range between two and four-storeys and many have wooden ceilings decorated with paintwork. Other important cities during the period of Ottoman rule include Hebron, Nablus, Ramla, Jaffa, Safad, and Tiberias. Most of these cities were surrounded by fortifications, and the best surviving example from this period is the wall re-constructed around Tiberias by Zahir al-Umar.

Housing varied by region, with mud-brick houses common along the coast, of which there are few surviving examples today. Predominant features of stone houses were the domed roofs which in the 18th century were often decorated with swirls, rosettes and semi-circles formed of carved plaster. Roofs in the Galilee region were differed in their use of transverse stone arches that supported short beams over which the roof was laid.

Ottoman fortresses that served as garrisons for the Janissaries (Ottoman troops) were abundant outside of Jerusalem. These large square or rectangular structures with square corner towers can still be seen at Ras al-Ain near Tel Aviv (the Binar Bashi fort), Khan al-Tujjar near Kafr Kanna, and Qal'at al-Burak south of Jerusalem.

=== British Mandate period (1918–1948) ===
The British sent a succession of six town planners to Mandate Palestine to try to manage intercommunal tensions that were a feature of this period. One of these was Charles Robert Ashbee, a prominent British Arts and Crafts designer, who served as Civic Adviser to the City of Jerusalem (1919–1922) and as a professional adviser to the Town Planning Commission. Described as "the most pro-Arab and anti-Zionist" of the six planners, Ashbee's view of Jerusalem, "was colored by a romantic sense of the vernacular." Aiming to protect this Palestinian vernacular and the city's secular and traditional fabric, Ashbee personally oversaw conservation and repair work in the city, and revived the craft industry there to repair the damaged Dome of the Rock. Other prominent town planners of the time were the British architects Clifford Holliday and Austen Harrison, and the German-Jewish architect Richard Kaufmann.

== Building materials and techniques ==
Two types of house predominated in Palestine from the second millennium BCE through to the modern era: the simple house found commonly in rural areas and the courtyard house found mostly in urban centers. Simple houses could be made from stone or excavated in rock, but most of the houses of this form common to the peasants of Palestine were likely made from sand-dried brick. Much of the traditional domestic architecture of modern Palestine, particularly in rural areas, was constructed using sun-dried brick, rather than stone. According to Tawfiq Canaan, this building tradition, in use at the beginning of the 20th century, was the same as that used by peasants in the 1st century who lived in sun-dried brick houses covered with tree branches; the upper floor serving as the family's living quarters, with the first floor used to house livestock.

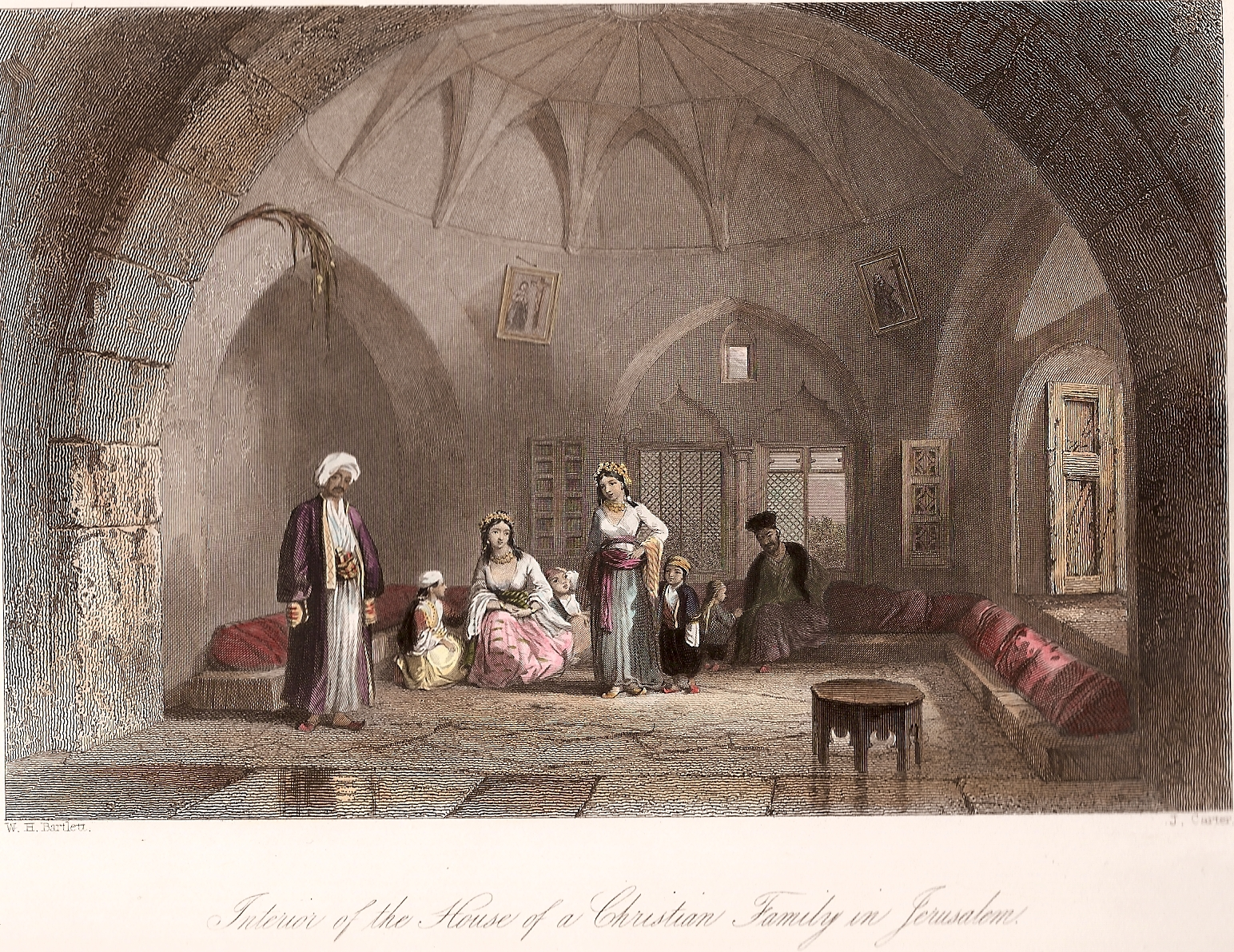
Interior of the house of a Palestinian Christian family in Jerusalem, portrayed in a print by W. H. Bartlett, c. 1850

The most characteristic type of domestic building in Palestine, according to Halvor Moxnes, was the courtyard house, consisting of several houses enclosed by a surrounding wall that shared a common courtyard to which there was one entrance. Members of the same or related families who are assumed to have enjoyed a good economic situation lived in such structures which generally spanned an area of 200 to 300 metres. Each would have had access to two or more rooms and used the courtyard for domestic tasks, such as the preparation of food, the making and washing of clothes, along with other agrarian and occupational tasks.

Petersen identified the main building materials used in Palestine in modern times as stone and unbaked brick, noting that wood and baked brick are hardly ever used. He describes some of the main types of stone used in the architecture of Palestine, which varied by region. For example, kurkar, a siliceous limestone, was used in building along the Mediterranean coast while basalt blocks were used in the northern part of the Jordan Rift Valley and the Sea of Galilee, often in conjunction with limestone for architectural detailing. Limestone of various colours ranging from white to pink were used in Ramla, Hebron and Jerusalem, with latter also making use of various types of marble. Dolomite, a hard limestone with magnesium, was used primarily in the Galilee. Mud-brick structures tended be more common in the Jordan Valley and coastal plain where stone was not readily available, and the best surviving examples of mud-brick architecture can be found today in Jericho.

Unique to the architecture of Palestine was the use of masonry cross-vaulting that was covered in mud over a centre supported wood formwork to create domical square spaces. The use of vaulting in construction was often due to a shortage in wood, but it was also preferred because of its permanence. Whereas in other places in the Arab world, vaulting was reserved for monumental structures, such as palaces, mosques and tombs or for below-ground storage areas, in Palestine, it was also used in the construction of homes. Another type of vaulting, groin vaults made of stone that are slightly parabolic in section, are said by Frederich Ragette to be a standard unit of construction in Palestine.

=== Vernacular architecture ===
The writings of Tawfiq Canaan which describe and survey Palestinian Arab folk traditions have provided much material for studies of Palestinian Arab vernacular architecture. Characteristic of this architecture is the harmony between site and structure, noted and celebrated by many other Western and Arab writers, and which also emerges as a theme in Canaan's work. For example, Canaan's 1930 report on a Palestinian house reads:

Those who travelled in the country observe a main characteristic which marks the construction of the majority of the Palestinian houses, namely the preference for straight lines, manifest in the walls, the doors, the windows, and most roofs. Owing to this characteristic, as well as to its simple square form and its greyish color, the Palestinian peasant's house harmonizes excellently with the landscape, and is more pleasing than most of the modern, occidental houses found in the modern colonies which have recently sprung up in Palestine. The fellah dwelling is also more suited to the climate of the country.

The sense of "rootedness" and "unmediated connectedness" which characterized Palestinian Arab vernacular architecture was also admired by Yoram Segal in his essay on "The Traditional House in the Arab Villages of the Galilee", published in the Israeli journal Tvai. Describing the relationship of the fellah to his house, which he builds and maintains with his own hands, Segal places emphasis on the sense "of belonging, of identification, and of strong emotional attachment." According to Sandra Sufian and Mark Levine, sabra architects who searched for a sense of nativeness in which to root their work, emulated this local style, appropriating the native as their own. Further, in order to Israelize this Arab vernacular style, it was depicted "as biblical architecture, as an uncontaminated primitive origin of architecture, or simply as Mediterranean."

==== Palestinian village house ====
The Palestinian village house is the best known house type to Western scholars. It is described and documented in travelogues, essays and photographs from the 17th century onward. The house was divided into two areas: a lower level known as qa' al-bayt near or at the entrance of the home and an elevated area known as the mastaba used for living and eating.

The size and uses of the lower level varies from house to house. In some cases it was a small area near the door, only 10–15 centimeters lower than the rest of the floor where visitors would take off their shoes before entering the house. In other cases, it would be a large area housing animals with an elevated gallery that allowed for use of the space below with the space above used for storage.

They had a farm on their roof because vegetables were cheap and easy and they cooked outside to let the heat out.

=== Masterbuilders ===
In Palestinian villages prior to 1948, there was at least one al-banna (expert stone mason and builder). When his skills would take him to work outside his village, he would be called mu'allim al-bina' (masterbuilder). His building skills were recognized by his society, whose labour would contribute to the construction of a stone house. Susan Slyomovics writes of one masterbuilder from the Abu El-Haija clan who constructed most of the stone houses in Ayn Hawd. Muhammed 'Abd al-Qadir, born in 1916, apprenticed with a masterbuilder in Haifa beginning at the age of eight. Over his long career, he built over 75 houses in Ayn Hawd, and a number of schoolhouses in neighbouring villages, and was among a "limited number of individuals [...] sought for their building skills and aesthetic expressiveness."

Some masterbuilders were commissioned to work beyond the boundaries of British Mandate Palestine. Abu Fawaz al-Malkawi from the village of Umm Qays on the east side of the Lake of Tiberias recalls that his father commissioned work from two masterbuilders from Safad, Abu Salim and Ali Safadi, to build a guesthouse and mosque in the 1930s. Ali Safadi was renown for his skill in vaulted architecture and with materials imported from Safad by donkey, he constructed a two-storey summer guesthouse with four separate 'aqd (vaulted rooms), one for each of client's wives.

== Photographs ==
Ernst Benecke photographed the land and architecture of Palestine in June 1852 using a calotype process which is said by Kathleen Howe to have been particularly suited to the subject matter. Of one calotype entitled In View of Herod's Palace, House of David, Howe writes that, "the softened details of the jumbled houses recreate in an almost tactile way the coarse stone masonry and daubed mud construction of the buildings."

== Israeli and Palestinian architecture ==
Of the architecture of Palestine, now divided between Israel and the occupied territories, Andrew Petersen distinguishes between the architecture of Israel and the architecture of the people. The latter are described as, "mostly the indigenous inhabitants of the country, whose architecture has developed within the landscape for at least the last two thousand years," while the architecture of Israel, established in 1948 with a largely immigrant population, is described as "[...] alien to the region."

== See also ==
- Liwan, architectural form from the Levant; a type of hall or vaulted portal
- Syro-Palestinian archaeology

== Bibliography ==
- Arce, Ignacio (2007), "Umayyad Building Techniques And The Merging Of Roman-Byzantine And Partho-Sassanian Traditions: Continuity And Change", in Lavan, E. Zanini; A. Sarantis (eds.), Technology in Transition A.D. 300-650, BRILL, p. 491–537, doi:10.1163/EJ.9789004165496.I-573.168
- Fletcher, Sir Banister; Cruickshank, Dan (1996). Dan Cruickshanke (ed.). Sir Banister Fletcher's a history of architecture (20th, illustrated ed.). Architectural Press. ISBN 978-0-7506-2267-7.
- Howe, Kathleen Stewart (1997). Revealing the Holy Land: the photographic exploration of Palestine (Illustrated ed.). St. Louis Art Museum: University of California Press. ISBN 978-0-89951-095-8.
- King, Anthony D. (2004). Spaces of global cultures: architecture, urbanism, identity (Illustrated, reprint ed.). Routledge. p. 168. ISBN 978-0-415-19620-8. "fuchs vernacular architecture palestinian."
- Moxnes, H. (1997). Constructing early Christian families: family as social reality and metaphor. CRC Press. ISBN 978-0-203-44049-0.
- Necipoğlu, G. (1998). Muqarnas: An Annual on the Visual Culture of the Islamic World (Illustrated, annotated ed.). BRILL. ISBN 978-90-04-11084-7.
- Petersen, Andrew (2002). Dictionary of Islamic Architecture. Routledge. ISBN 978-0-203-20387-3.
- Pringle, D. (1998), The Churches of the Crusader Kingdom of Jerusalem: L-Z (excluding Tyre), Cambridge University Press, ISBN 0-521-39037-0
- Ragette, Friedrich (2003). Traditional domestic architecture of the Arab Region (2nd, illustrated ed.). Edition Axel Menges. ISBN 978-3-932565-30-4.
- Rast, Walter E. (1992). Through the ages in Palestinian archaeology: an introductory handbook (Illustrated ed.). Continuum International Publishing Group. ISBN 978-1-56338-055-6.
- Szuchman, Jeffrey (2009). Nomads, Tribes, and the State in the Ancient Near East: Cross-disciplinary Perspectives (PDF). Oriental Institute of the University of Chicago. ISBN 978-1885923615.
- Slyomovics, Susan (1998). The Object of Memory: Arab and Jew Narrate the Palestinian Village (Illustrated ed.). University of Pennsylvania Press. ISBN 978-0-8122-1525-0.
- Sufian, Sandra Marlene; LeVine, Mark (2007). Reapproaching borders: new perspectives on the study of Israel-Palestine (Illustrated ed.). Rowman & Littlefield. ISBN 978-0-7425-4639-4.
