= Yavne =

Yavne יַבְנֶה
- City

Hebrew transcription(s)
  - ISO 259: Yabne
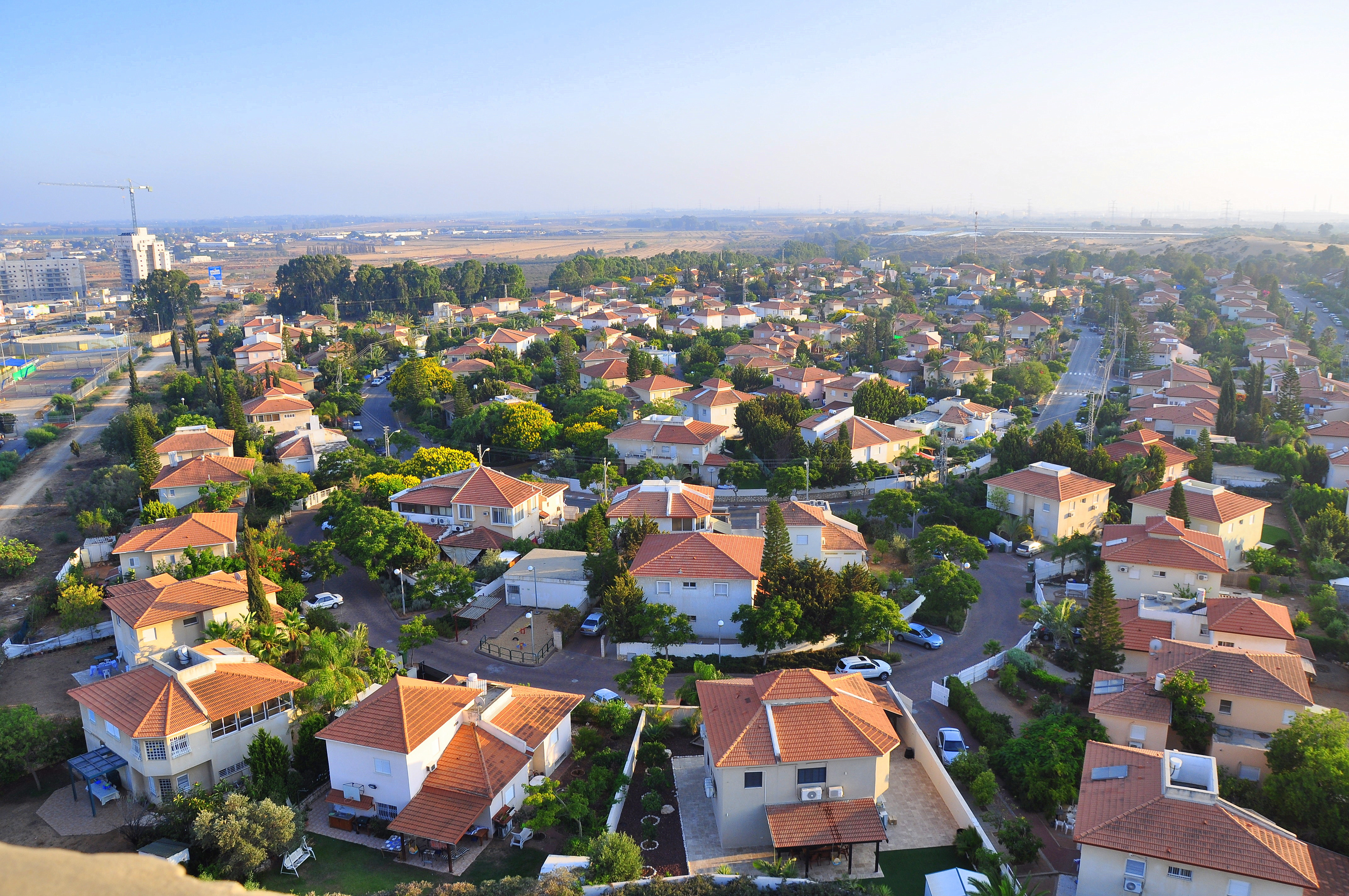

- Emblem of Yavne

- Location within Central Israel Location within Israel
- Coordinates: 31°53′N 34°44′E
- Country: Israel
- District: Central
- Subdistrict: Rehovot
- Natural Region: Rehovot
- Founded: 2000 BCE (Canaanite city); 37 BCE (Herodian rule); 7th century Islamic period (Arab village); 1949 (Israeli city)

Government
  - Mayor: Roei Gabay

Area
  - Total: 10,700 dunams (10.7 km^{2}; 4.1 sq mi)

Population (2024)
  - Total: 58,090
  - Density: 5,430/km^{2} (14,100/sq mi)

Ethnicity
  - Jews and others: 99.9%
  - Arabs: 0.1%
- Website: www.yavne.muni.il

Yavne (Hebrew: יַבְנֶה) is a city in the Central District of Israel. In 2024 it had a population of 58,090.

Modern Yavne was established in 1949. It is located near the ruins of the ancient town of Yibna (known also as Jamnia and Jabneh), later the village of Yibna, and today the archeological site of Tel Yavne. Ancient Yavne holds a special place in Jewish history because of the ancient town's contribution to Judaism's recovery and reconstitution under sages ben Zakkai and Gamaliel II following the destruction of the Second Temple. This period, sometimes known as the "Yavne period", became a crucial mark in the development of Rabbinic Judaism. The city has a history of producing wine throughout much of antiquity, as indicated by both archeological findings and ancient sources.

== Name ==
In many English translations of the Bible, Yavne was known as Jabneh /ˈdʒæbnə/. In Greek and Latin-speaking sources, it was known as Jamnia (Ancient Greek: Ἰαμνία Iamníā; Latin: Iamnia). Under Late Roman and Byzantine rule, it had a mixed population of Christians, Jews, and Samaritans. Under the Crusaders, the city was known as Ibelin, and was where the House of Ibelin resided. During the Ottoman and British periods, it was known as Yibna (Arabic: يبنى). The ancient site is now found at the Tel Yavne archeological site, which is southeast of the modern city.

== Geography ==
Yavne is a city in the Central District of Israel, located about six kilometers from the Mediterranean Sea in the southern coastal plain region, on the eastern border of the Yavne sand dunes. It is situated between the moshav of Ben Zakai to the south, Ashdod, Gan Yavne, Hazor Ashdod, and Nitzanim to the southwest, Gan Raveh and Kfar HaNagid to the north, Givat Brenner to the east, Bait Gamliel to the southeast, Rehovot to the east-southeast, and Gealya to the northeast.

== History ==
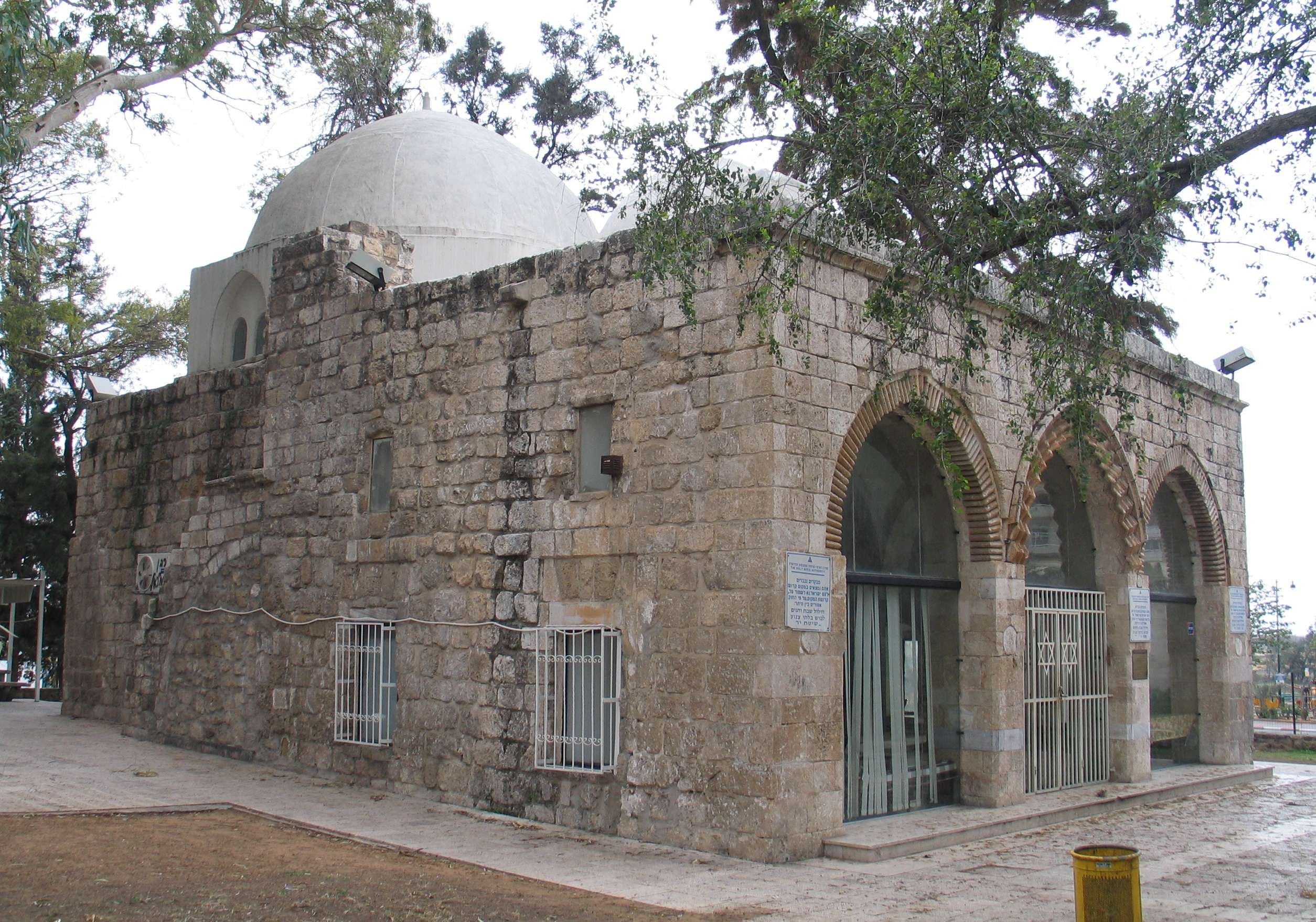
Twelfth-century Mausoleum of Abu Huraira in Yavne, attributed to both Rabbi Gamaliel of Yavne and Abu Hurairah, a companion of Muhammad.

=== Ancient Yavne ===
==== Antiquity ====
Yavne was one of the major ancient cities in the southern coastal plain, situated 20 km (12.43 mi) south of Jaffa, 15 km (9.32 mi) north of Ashdod, and 7 km (4.35 mi) east of the Mediterranean.

From excavations of the ancient tell (mound created by accumulation of archaeological remains) known as Tel Yavne (Hebrew), which developed on a natural kurkar hill, the area shows to have been inhabited continuously from either the Bronze or Iron Age until the British Mandate. During some periods, especially the Byzantine period, the settlement expanded to cover part of the plain and hills surrounding the tell. Yavne is mentioned in the Bible and other ancient texts.

In Roman times, the city was known as Iamnia or Jamnia. It was bequeathed by King Herod upon his death to his sister Salome. Upon her death it passed to Emperor Augustus, who ran it as a private imperial estate, a status retained for at least a century. After Salome's death, Iamnia came into the property of Livia, the future Roman empress, and then to her son Tiberius.

In the 40s AD, a dispute emerged in Jamnia when Gentiles constructed a mud-brick altar to the Emperor, provoking the local Jewish population. The Jews destroyed the altar, which they saw as desecration. This led the Gentiles to complain to Capito, the imperial revenue collector in Judaea, who reported the matter to Emperor Caligula. In retaliation, Caligula ordered a statue of himself as Jupiter to be placed in the Holy of Holies at the Temple of Jerusalem.

Iamnia played a role in several events during the First Jewish–Roman War. In 66 AD, the Roman tribune Neapolitanus met with King Agrippa II in Iamnia, to inform him of his mission to investigate the situation in Jerusalem, following Florus' seizure of Temple funds and clashes between Jews and Roman troops. Later, in spring 68 AD, after the Roman army under Vespasian quelled the insurrection in Galilee, the army marched upon Iamnia and Azotus, taking both towns and stationing garrisons within them.

Following the failure of the revolt and the destruction of the Second Temple, Judaism underwent significant reform in Yavne. According to rabbinic tradition, Rabbi Yohanan ben Zakkai and his disciples were permitted to settle in Iamnia during the outbreak of the war, after ben Zakkai, realizing that Jerusalem was about to fall, departed the city and sought the permission of Vespasian, commander of the Roman forces, to settle in Yavne and teach his disciples. Upon the fall of Jerusalem, his school functioned as a Sanhedrin. It was also theorized for some time to have been the site of a supposed Council of Jamnia that established the rabbinic Jewish biblical canon (although current scholarship largely rejects the theory that such a council in fact occurred).

According to the Jerusalem Talmud (Berakhot 1:4), when the rabbis argued over some fine point of Jewish law, a Divine voice (Hebrew: bat ḳol) was heard in Yavne, ruling in favor of the School of Hillel. To counter a perceived threat to rabbinical authority, the Talmud states that Shmuel ha-Katan of Yavne enacted the "twelfth benediction" in the daily prayer, i.e., the benediction against apostates and heretics (Hebrew: minim).

==== Crusader period ====
The Crusaders renamed the city Ibelin and built its castle there in 1141. An excavation led by Professor Dan Bahat in 2005 revealed the main gate. Its namesake noble family, the House of Ibelin, was important in the Kingdom of Jerusalem and later in the Kingdom of Cyprus. Salvage excavations at the west of the tell unearthed a stash of 53 Crusader coins of the 12th and 13th centuries.

==== Muslim Yibna, Early Islamic to Mamluk period ====
The Islamic historian al-Baladhuri (died 892 AD) describes Yibna as one of ten towns in Jund Filastin conquered by the Rashidun army led by 'Amr ibn al-'As in the early 7th century. Ibelin was first sacked by Saladin before his army was routed at the Battle of Montgisard in late 1177. In August 1187, it was retaken and burnt to the ground, and ceased for some time to form part of the Crusaders' kingdom.

==== Mosque ====
Ibelin's parish church was converted into a mosque, to which a minaret was added during the Mamluk period in 1337. The minaret is still standing, although the mosque itself (the former Crusader church) was blown up by the IDF in 1950.

=== Tomb of Abu Huraira/Gamaliel ===
The Mausoleum of Abu Huraira, known in Arabic as Maqam Abu Hurayra, described as "one of the finest domed mausoleums in Palestine", dates back to the 12th century. It was said to be the tomb of Abu Hurairah, a companion (sahaba) of the Islamic prophet Muhammad. Abu Hurairah however is buried in Medina, Saudi Arabia, but he was also venerated in various places in Palestine, namely in Ramle and Yavne. After 1948 the shrine was adopted by Mizrahi Jews who believe the tomb is the burial place of Rabbi Gamaliel of Yavne. Jewish worshippers say that it was a Jewish burial site that was Islamized later, although there is no record of Jewish pilgrimage there before 1948.

==== British Mandate ====
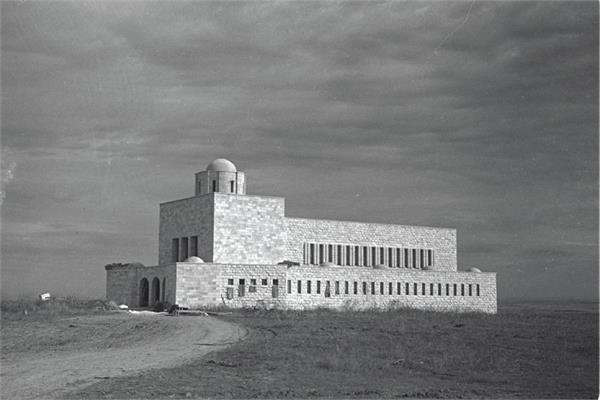
The "Kerem B'Yavneh" yeshiva, 1945

In mid-March 1948, a contingent of Iraqi soldiers moved into the village. In a Haganah reprisal on 30 March, two dozen villagers were killed. On April 21, the Iraqi village commander was arrested in Jaffa for drunkenly shooting two Arabs.

During the 1948 Arab-Israeli war, residents of Zarnuqa sought refuge in Yibna, but left after the villagers accused them of being traitors.

On 27 May, following the fall of Al-Qubayba and Zarnuqa, most of the population of Yibna fled to Isdud, but armed males were refused entry. On 5 June, when Israeli troops arrived, they found the village almost deserted apart from a few old people who were ordered to leave.

In the 1930s, a plan was proposed to rebuild the ancient Talmudic academy founded by Yochanan Ben Zakkai. In 1941, an agreement was reached between the Jewish National Fund and the Mizrachi/Hapoel Mizrachi movements, allocating five hundred dunams in Yavne area for a yeshiva. In 1948, the building was used as a forward post by Yigal Alon, commander of the southern front, because of its commanding view of the coastal plain.

=== Foundation of Modern Yavne ===
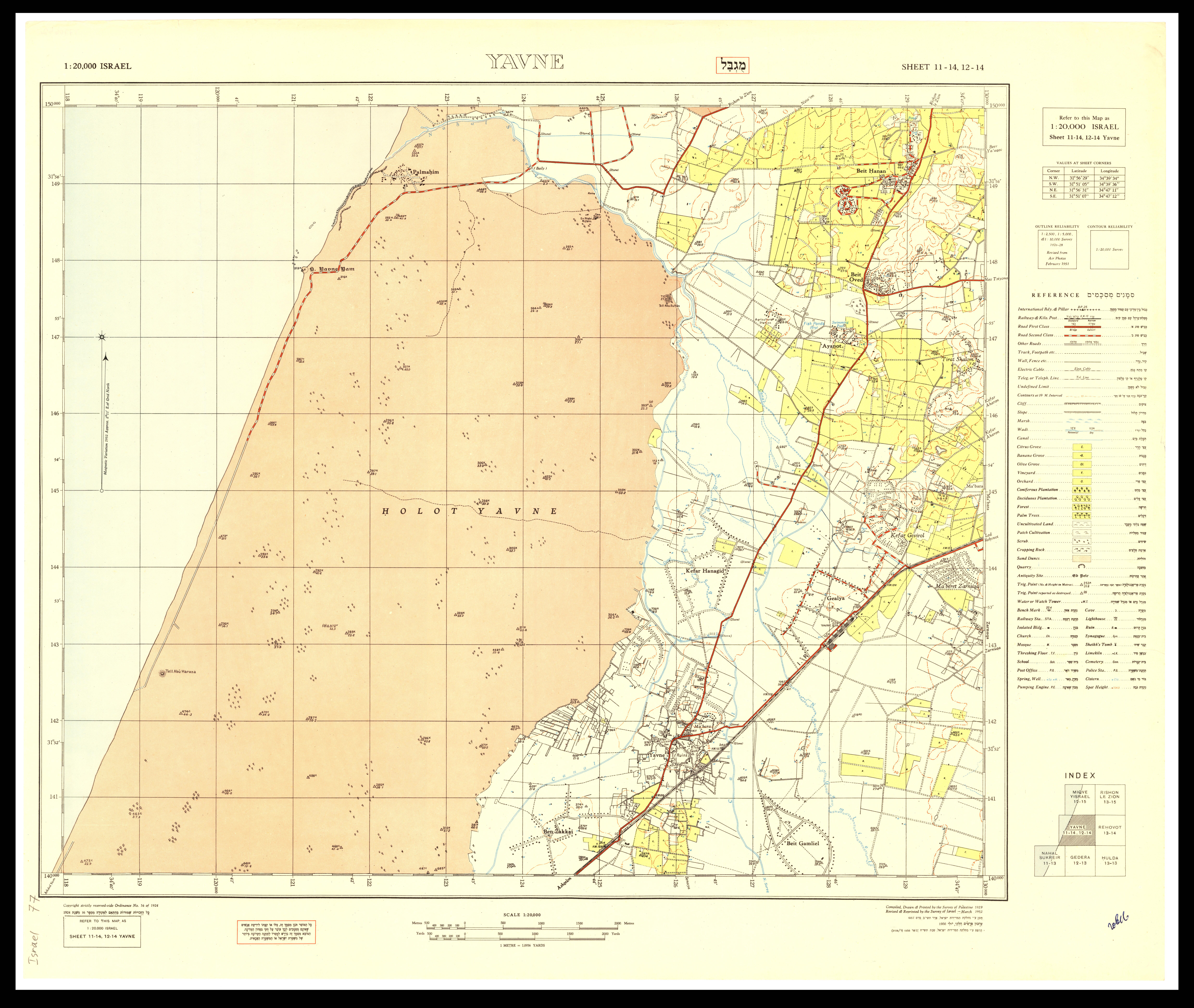
Yavne in 1958. The site of Yibna shown in ruins. The Ma'bara (development town) lies north of the ruins

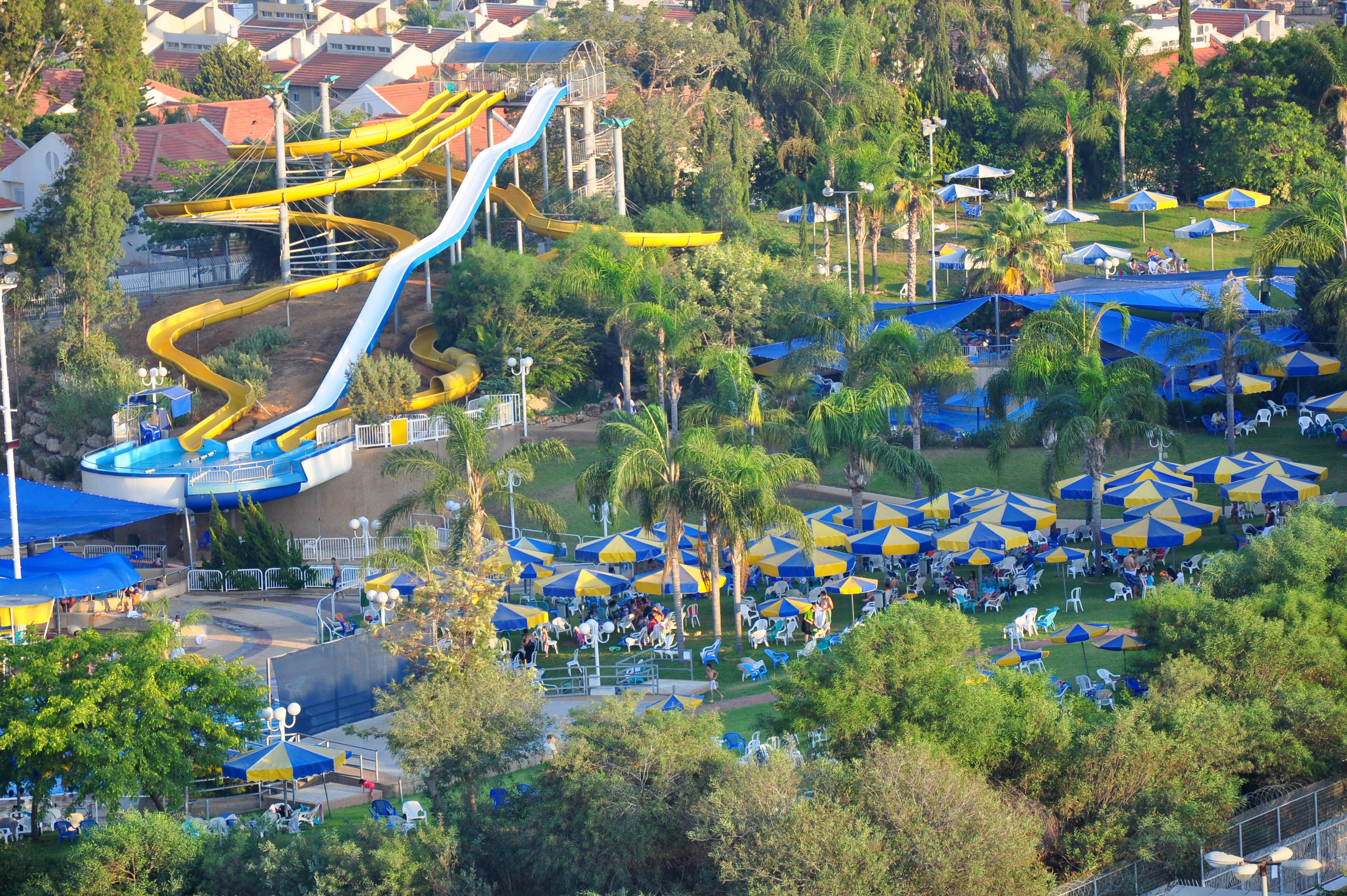
Yavne water park

Yavne was established in October 1948 as a transit camp for Jews from Arab countries, Iran and Europe. The first neighbourhood was established in early 1949. In the early years, the inhabitants were shopkeepers, farmers and construction workers. In 1953, the population was 1,600. In the 1960s, several enterprises moved from Tel Aviv to Yavne, establishing leather, textile, and metallurgy industries. By 1970, the population had grown to 10,100. Other Israeli villages that were founded near the former Yibna site were Kfar HaNagid and Beit Gamliel in 1949, Ben Zakai in 1950, and Kfar Aviv (originally: "Kfar HaYeor") in 1951. According to Walid Khalidi, a railroad crosses the village. The old mosque and minaret, together with a shrine can still be seen, and some of the old houses are inhabited by Jewish and Arab families.

The 1980 edition of a guidebook published in Jerusalem describes Yavne as home to Israel's first atomic reactor, an image of which appeared on a 0.50 Shekel stamp.

When Mayor Meir Sheetrit assumed office in 1974, the city became a low-density suburban satellite of Tel Aviv with new construction targeting middle-class families. Yavne achieved city status in 1986. By the mid-1990s, the population had risen to 25,600.

== Demography ==
Historical population
Year	Pop.	±%
1972	9,800	—
1983	13,800	+40.8%
1995	27,500	+99.3%
2008	32,800	+19.3%
2022	54,981	+67.6%
2024	58,090	+5.7%

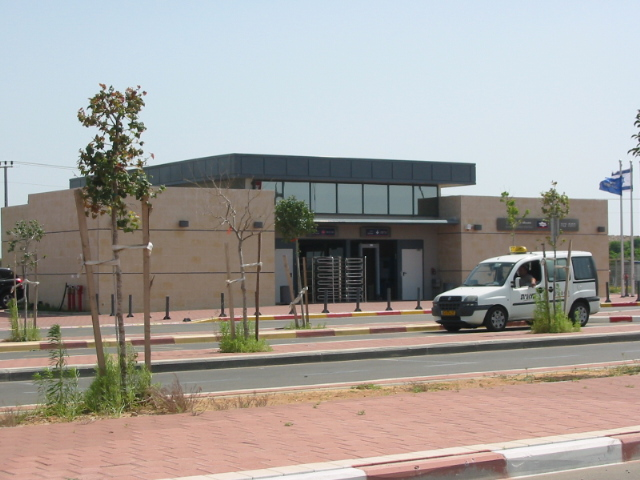
Yavne East railway station

According to the Israel Central Bureau of Statistics (CBS), in 2021 the ethnic makeup of the city was 99 percent Jewish and others, without significant Arab population. As of March 2021 the city numbered 53,595 persons, with a high percentage of young people: 37% of the population was in the 0–19 age group and 71% of the total population was younger than 44.

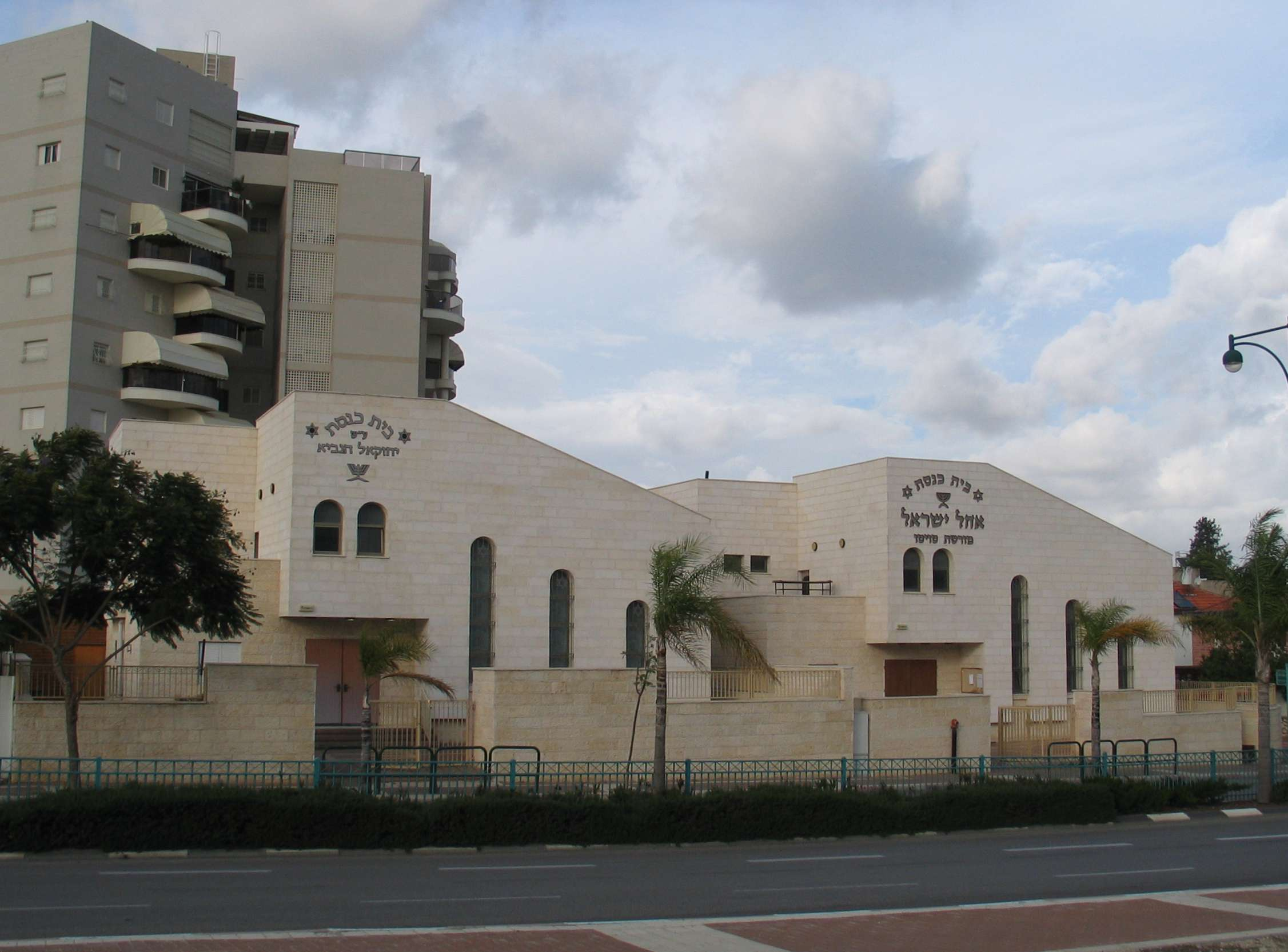
Synagogue in Yavne

== Economy ==
Major companies based in Yavne include Ormat Industries, Aeronautics Defense Systems, Avisar and Orbotech. In 2019, Merck established an incubator in Yavne with a budget of about €20 million over three years that will invest in startups focusing on semiconductor and display crystal technologies. In 2022 Recipharm established a new facility in Yavne. MediWound manufactures NexoBrid in Yavne, a unique product for the treatment of severe burns. It allows saving affected tissue which would otherwise need to be removed, leading to less amputations of hands and feet. Many October 7, 2023 victims have benefitted from it, with the US also buying $20 million worth of NexoBrid for its strategic national stockpile.

In 2012 a new green neighborhood "Neot Rabin" was inaugurated in the south of the city.

== Sports ==
Maccabi Yavne is the city's major football club. During the 1980s the club played in the top division and in 1985 won the Toto Cup. Today they are in Liga Leumit. The basketball team, Elitzur Yavne, have also played in the Liga Leumit since 2007.

Omri Casspi, the first Israeli to play in the National Basketball Association, grew up in the city and played for some of its teams.

== Archaeology ==
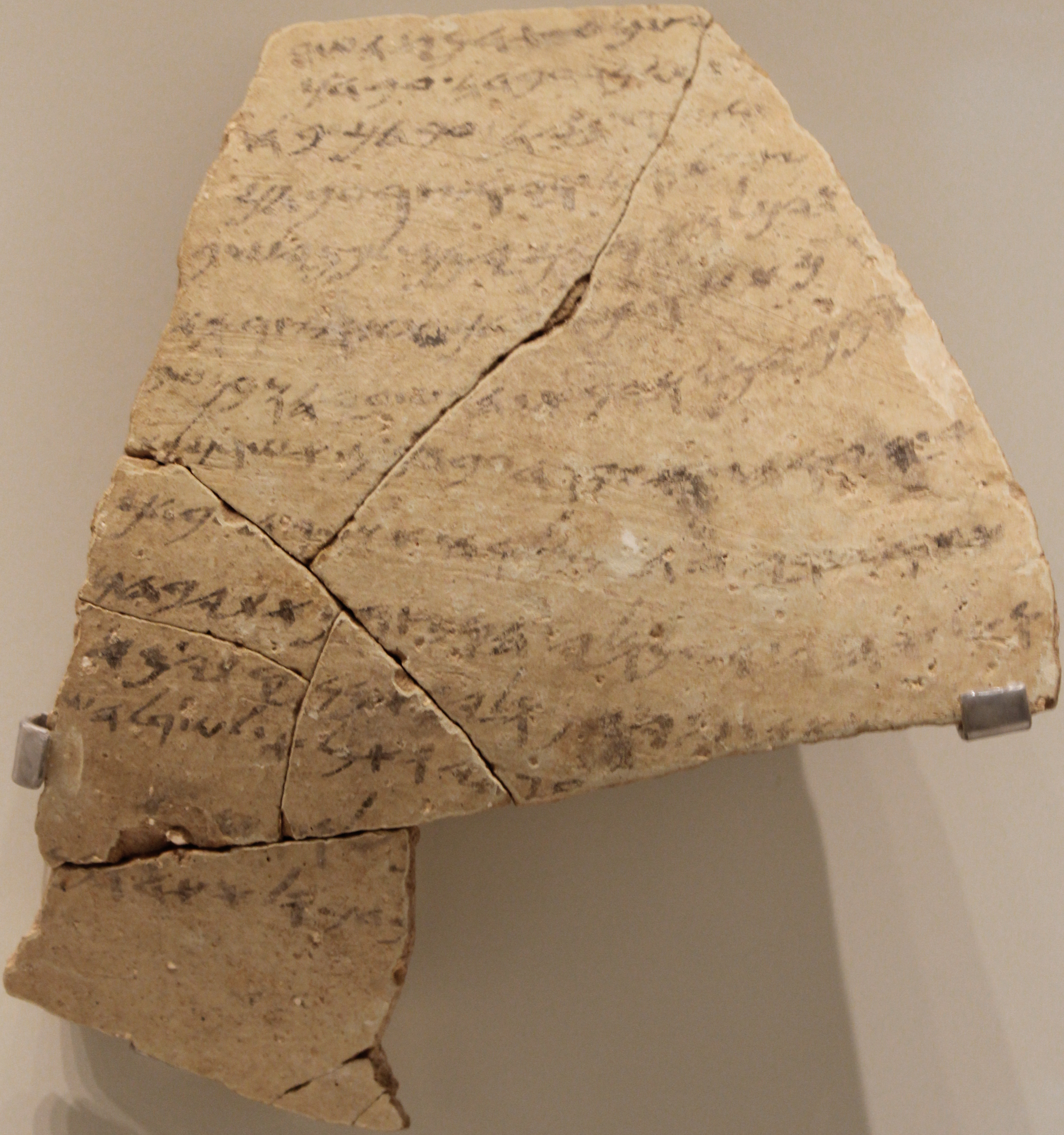
The Yavne-Yam ostracon, a Paleo-Hebrew inscription documenting administration in Judah

Tel Yavne was first excavated in 2005 in a dig headed by Dan Bahat, who unearthed the gate room of the Crusader castle of Ibelin, as well as a vault destroyed with gunpowder by the Mamluks and deeply embedded Crusader walls east of it, all at or around the top of the tell.

In December 2019, a large number of pottery kilns and 1,200-year-old gold coins which may have been a local potter's "piggy bank" were unearthed in a juglet by the Israel Antiquities Authority. According to archaeologist Robert Kool, the coins date back to the early Abbasid period, about 9th century CE. One of the seven coins was minted by Caliph Harun al-Rashid (786–809 CE). "These are gold dinars issued by the Aghlabid dynasty that ruled in North Africa. Without a doubt this is a wonderful Hanukkah present for us," said Kool. In August 2020, Israeli archaeologists discovered 425 complete gold coins, most dating to the Abbasid period around 1,100 years ago. In April 2021, archaeologists announced the discovery of a 1,600-year-old multicolored mosaic dated back to the Byzantine period in an industrial area. According to IAA archaeologist Elie Haddad, it was the first time that excavators revealed a colored mosaic floor in Yavne.

The ancient harbour of Yavne, Yavne-Yam (in Arabic Minet Rubin) was identified on the coast. Excavations have revealed fortification going back to the Bronze Age Hyksos. It was in use from the Middle Bronze Age until the 12th century CE, when it was abandoned.

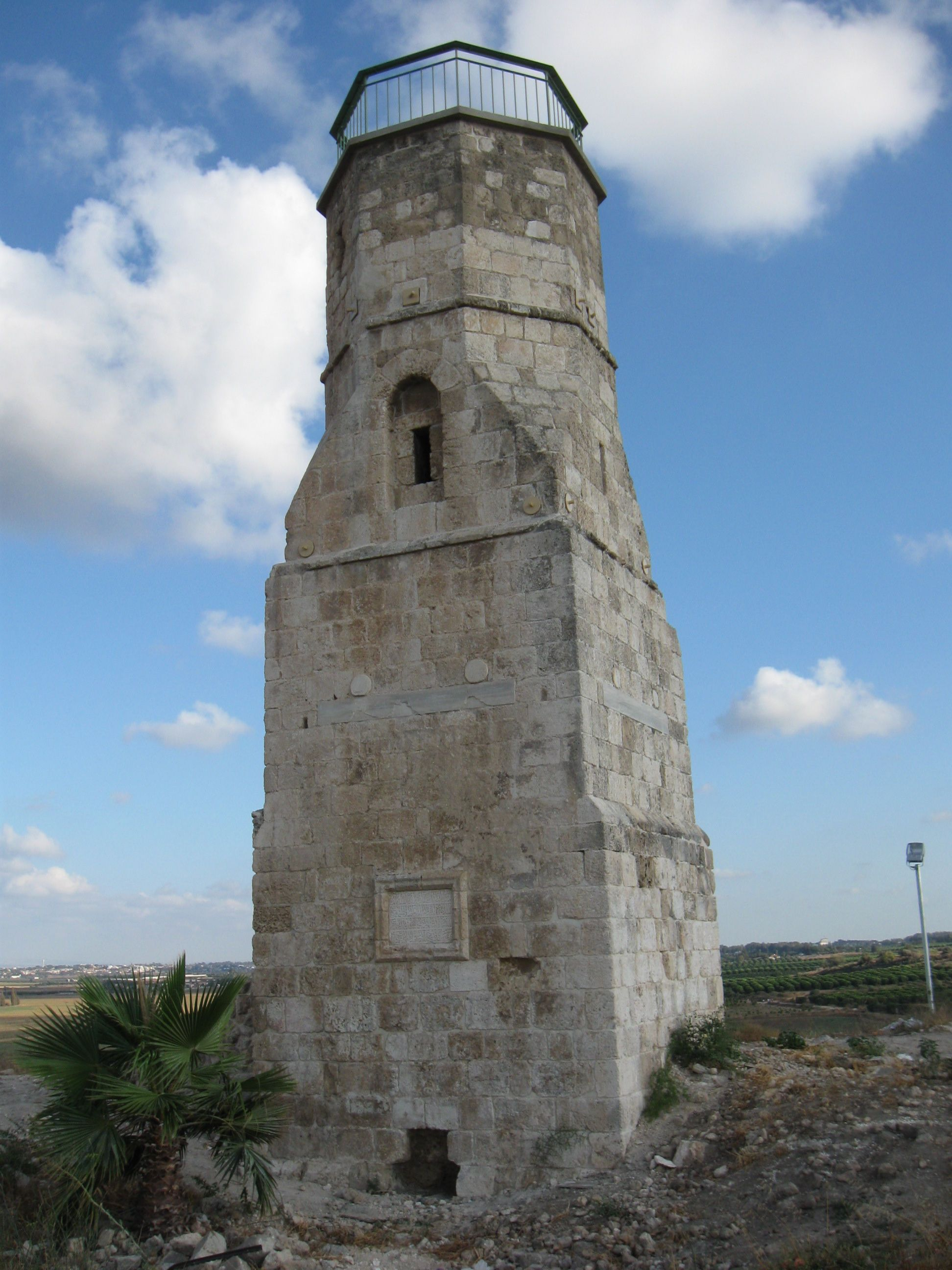
Mamluk minaret, Yavne

== Voting Patterns ==
In the 2022 election, 62 percent of voters in Yavne voted for the parties of the right-wing coalition led by Benjamin Netanyahu, while 36 percent voted for the parties of the center-left coalition led by Yair Lapid and 0.1 percent voted for the Arab parties.

In the 2026 election, 56 percent of voters in Yavne voted for the parties of the right-wing coalition led by Benjamin Netanyahu, while 37 percent voted for the parties of the center-left coalition led by Gadi Eisenkot and 0.1 percent voted for the Arab parties. An additional 4.4 percent voted for the Reservists, and 2.1 percent voted for Amcha Yisrael. Voter turnout increased 12 percent from the 2022 election.

== Notable people ==
- Avior Byron (born 1973), singer, songwriter, and musicologist
- Omri Casspi (born 1988), Israeli professional NBA basketball player
- Itai Chammah (born 1985), Olympic swimmer
- Gil Dor, guitar player
- Elishay Kadir (born 1987), basketball player
- Uri Kokia (born 1981), basketball player and coach
- Shlomi Koriat (born 1976), actor and comedian
- Maor Melikson, footballer
- Nevo Mizrahi (born 1987), footballer
- Mushail Mushailov, artist
- Ido Nehoshtan, Major-General (ret.), former chief of Israeli Air Force
- Shabak Samech, rap and hip-hop group
- Meir Sheetrit (born 1948), Israeli Minister of the Interior

== Sister cities ==
Yavne is twinned with:

- Le Raincy, France
- Speyer, Germany
- Sunrise, Florida, United States
- East Brunswick, New Jersey, United States

== See also ==
- Archaeology of Israel
- Economy of Israel
- Yeshivat Kerem B'Yavneh
