= Avior Byron =

Israeli singer songwriter and musicologist

Avior Byron אביאור ביירון
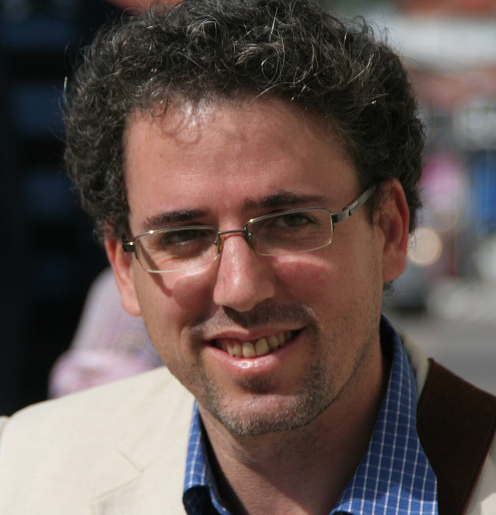

Background information
- Born: August 1, 1973 (age 52)
- Origin: Israel
- Genres: Rock, progressive rock, folk
- Occupations: Singer-songwriter, musician
- Instruments: Vocals, guitar
- Label: Banana records
- Website: aviorbyron.com/en/

Avior Byron (Hebrew: אביאור ביירון) (born 1973) is an Israeli singer songwriter and musicologist.

== Biography ==
Avior Byron was born in Petah Tikva, and grew up in Yavne. From the age of ten he studied classical piano, and from thirteen learnt rock and jazz guitar. At the age of fifteen, he had a band, in which he was the composer, the singer and the guitarist.

He started to study at Tel Aviv University, and he graduated with a B.A. in musicology and orchestration. Avior has a doctorate in music from Royal Holloway, University of London. His tutor for the doctorate was Prof. John Rink, and the subject of his thesis was "Schoenberg as a performer: esthetics in practice".

In 2001 Byron became religious; from 2011–2016 he studied literature, Judaism, philosophy and Hebrew poetry in the friends' program of "Alma – Home for Hebrew Culture". At the conclusion of their studies, the students were asked to prepare works of art, and Byron composed songs, some of which appear in his debut album.

In 2015, he issued a mini-album "Songs for Zipporah", which is composed of five songs; Yuval Messner produced the album. The subject matter of the songs is the social protest, tolerance, and accepting the other, Israeli and Jewish identity. The texts contain dialogues with Jewish sources. The melodies, and style of playing are influenced by classical music, rock, jazz, Folk and alternative tuning of the guitar. “Ruth is waiting", is a protest song about the imperviousness of the religious establishment towards those who wish to convert to Judaism “Zipporah" is a love song to his wife. “In the streets of the city" is a song about a woman from biblical times, who lives on the edge of society, and criticizes the status of women in the past and in the present. "Signs on sand" is a love song to his children, and talks of the heritage that we leave them. “Ruth is waiting" was the song chosen from the album to be played on the radio. Other songs were also posted on various web sites. The media have called Byron: “The First Religious Protest Singer”.

Since 2014, Byron has been appearing throughout Israel with the songs from the album, and others that he has written and set to music. In February 2016, he signed a contract with “Banana Disc” for the distribution of “Songs for Zipporah”.

Byron has published articles in musicology journals, including "Music Theory Online". He specializes in the following fields: Research into musical performance, theory and analysis, twentieth century music. Currently Byron is working on a book, on Arnold Schoenberg, to be published by Oxford University Press. He has written a number of articles for Nrg and Ynet.

He worked as a lecturer at Bar-Ilan University. In 2013, he taught at "Alma – Home for Hebrew Culture", and since 2014, he has been lecturing at Achva Academic College. He is CEO of "Byron Seminars", a company for translations, and teaching languages, which was founded by his parents in 1987.

Avior Byron lives in Mazkeret Batya with his wife and their three children. They belong to the "Keshet" congregation there.

== See also ==
- Judy Maltz, "A Singer With a Blunt Message for Israel: Don’t Mess With Converts", in Haaretz, July 22, 2015
- Shay Binyamin Shemesh, "There was darkness, there was Avior", in the newspaper "Yediot Aharonot", Rehovot, issue 1289, Friday Av 1st 5775, July 17, 2015, pp. 54–56.
