= Mausoleum of Abu Hurayra =

Maqam and synagogue in Yavne, Israel

Mausoleum of Abu Huraira; (Rabban Gamaliel's Tomb)
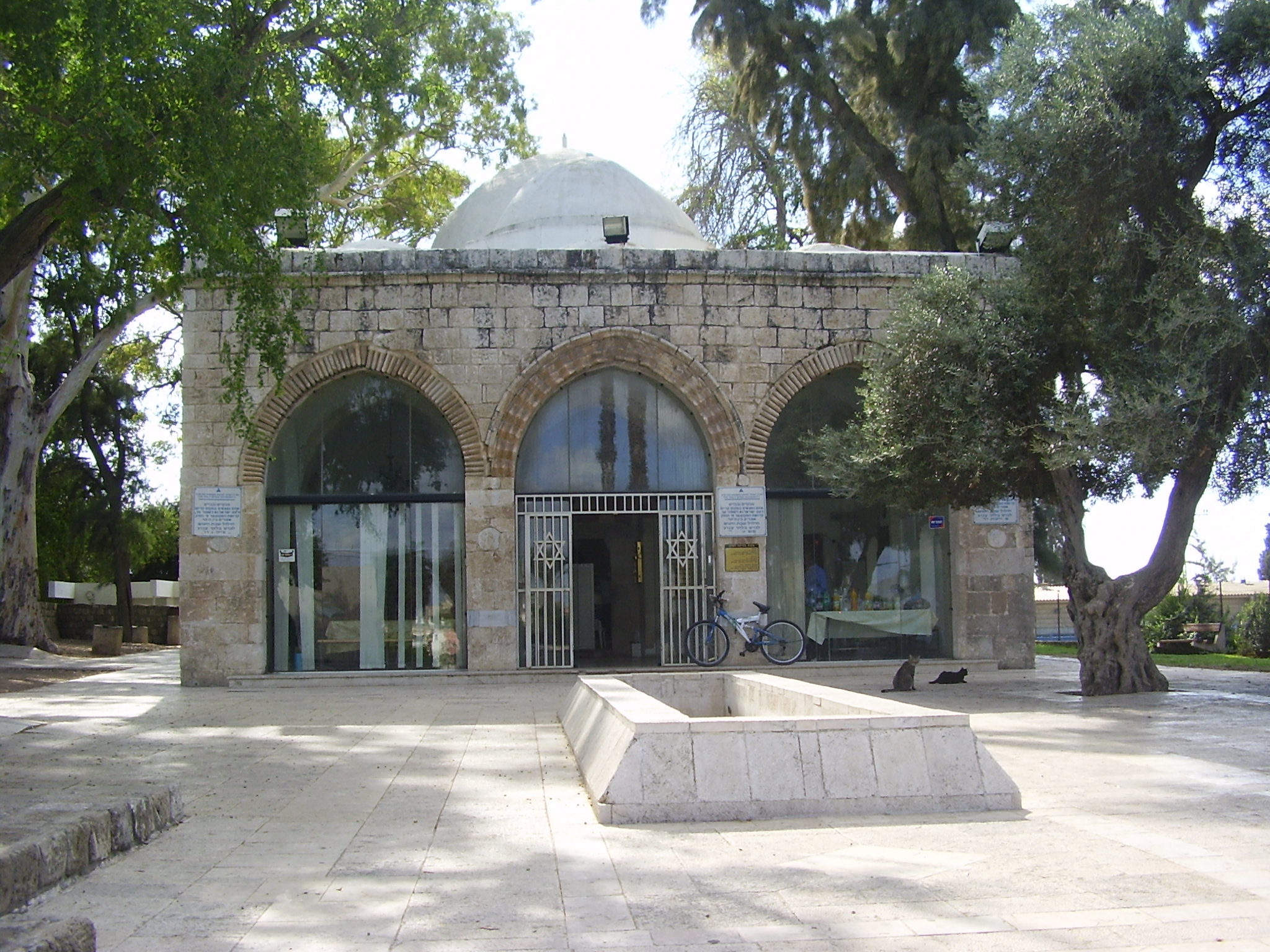
- The portico façade, in 2010

- Location of the mausoleum and synagogue, in Central Israel

Religion
- Affiliation: Orthodox Judaism
- Ecclesiastical or organisational status: Mausoleum / maqam; Synagogue
- Status: Active (as a synagogue)
- Former denomination: Islam

Location
- Location: HaSanhedrin Park, Yavne, Rehovot Subdistrict, Central District
- Country: Israel
- Coordinates: 31°52′03″N 34°44′36″E

Architecture
- Type: Mausoleum / maqam
- Style: Mamluk architecture
- Completed: c. 13th century (as a tomb)
- Dome: Two (maybe more)

The mausoleum of Abu Hurayra (Arabic: ضريح أبي هريرة), or Rabban Gamaliel's Tomb (Hebrew: קבר רבן גמליאל), is a maqam turned synagogue in Sanhedrin Park in Yavne, Rehovot Subdistrict, in the Central District of Israel, in the depopulated Palestinian village of Yibna. It has been described as "one of the finest domed mausoleums in Palestine."

The mausoleum is located on a cemetery northwest of Yibna that residents have used for burial since at least the Roman period. Since the early 13th century, Muslims identified it as one of the purported burial places of Abu Hurairah, a companion of Muhammad. However, most Arabic sources give Medina as his final resting place. The date of the inner tomb chamber is uncertain, with contemporary sources allowing the assumption that a tomb chamber existed at the site and was associated with Abu Hurairah already before Mamluk sultan Baybars's additions. In 1274, Baybars ordered the construction of the riwaq featuring a tripartite portal and six tiny domes together with a dedicatory inscription, with the site expanded further in 1292 by Sultan al-Ashraf Khalil. (Note: The most famous construction project financed by Baybars in Yavneh was the magnificent addition to Maqām Abu Hureira (the "Raban Gamaliel tomb"), which consisted of double stoai with domes (riwāq). The construction activity was carried out in 1274 by the governor of Ramla, Khalīl Ibn Sawīr. The tomb itself existed at least since the beginning of the 13th century, as shown by Alī al-Harawī (1215 CE) and the geographer Yāqūt (1225 CE).)

The tomb is known to Jews as the tomb of Gamaliel II, the first Nasi of the Sanhedrin after the fall of the Second Temple. A Hebrew travel guide dated to between 1266 and 1291 attributes the tomb to Gamaliel and describes it as being occupied by a Muslim prayer house.

During the decades before 1948, no visible active or large-scale Jewish pilgrimage to Yavneh was recorded. Following the 1948 Arab–Israeli War the mausoleum was officially designated as a shrine for Jews by Israel.

In all likelihood, neither Rabban Gamaliel nor Abu Hurairah are buried in the tomb.

== History ==
=== Pre-Muslim times ===
The ground on which the structure stands, northwest of Yibna, has been used by residents for burial since at least the Roman period.

=== Crusader/Ayyubid period ===
Ali ibn Abi Bakr al-Harawi (d. 1215), followed by Yaqut al-Hamawi (d. 1229) and the Marāṣid al-ʾiṭṭilāʿ (Arabic: مراصد الاطلاع, an abridgement of Yaqut's work by Safi al-Din 'Abd al-Mu'min ibn 'Abd al-Haqq, d.1338), mention that in Yubna there was a tomb said to be that of Abu Hurayra, the companion of the Prophet. The Marāṣid also adds that the tomb seen here is also said to be that of Abd Allah ibn Sa'd, another companion of the Prophet.

Yavne's population at the time was a mixture of Muslims, Samaritans, and - during the Crusader period - Christians, with Benjamin of Tudela (12th century) finding no Jewish inhabitants there. During the Middle Ages, apart from Muslims (and Christians in the Crusader period), Samaritans continued to inhabit Yibna. The Tolidah, a Samaritan chronicle written sometime during the 12th−14th centuries, mentions a Samaritan family that moved from Ashkelon to Yibna, called here "Iamma", and other Samaritans that moved from the city to Egypt. According to Ben-Zvi, this event occurred when Yibna fell to the Ayyubids in 1187 (1976: 108). The Samaritan presence in Yavneh was continuous and lasted from the late Roman period at least until the 12th century. As mentioned previously, there are no records from the early Islamic period about a Jewish presence in Yavneh, yet no records exist to refute such a presence. On the other hand, Benjamin of Tudela (12th century), who passed through Yavneh on his way from Jaffa to Ashkelon, clearly states that no Jews were living there (Benjamin of Tudela 43).

=== Mamluk period ===
Sultan Baybars constructed the shrine and a three-arched bridge over the Soreq Stream, reinforcing Yibna's position on the Damascus–Cairo road. Later Mamluk rulers further embellished the shrine and added to it associated mic structures and waterworks.

A Hebrew travel guide from between 1266 and 1291 mentions that the tomb of Rabban Gamaliel in Yavne is used as a Muslim prayer house. The following century, another Jewish traveler, Ishtori Haparchi, described Abu Hurayra's mausoleum as 'a very fine memorial to Rabbi Gamliel.'

=== Ottoman and British Mandate periods ===
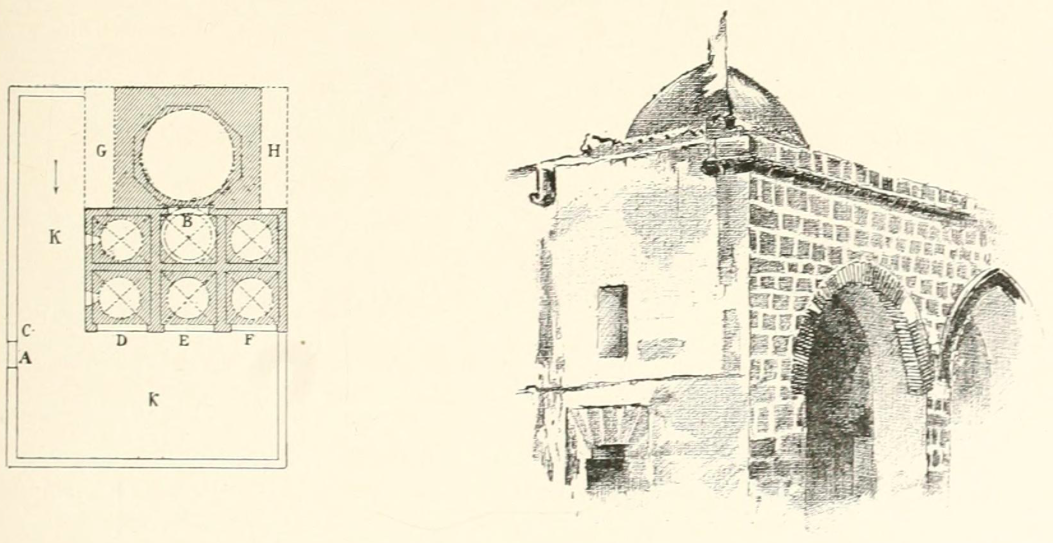
Sketch of Mausoleum of Abu Huraira by Clermont-Ganneau, 1874

In 1765, the Egyptian scholar Muṣṭafā Asʿad al-Luqaymī visited the mausoleum, and he attributed it to a descendant of Abu Hurayra, rather than to Abu Hurayra himself.

In 1863 Victor Guérin visited, describing the site as a mosque. In 1882, Conder and Kitchener described it: "The mosque of Abu Hureireh is a handsome building under a dome, and contains two inscriptions, the first in the outer court, the second in the wall of the interior."

During the British Mandate of Palestine the porch of the building was used for school rooms. The area near the mausoleum served as Yibna's principal cemetery, but it was also used nomadic groups encamped in the Rimal Yibna dunefield west of the village.

=== State of Israel ===
Following the 1948 Arab–Israeli War, immigrant Sephardic Jews from Arab countries began to pray at the site due to their belief that the tomb is the burial place of Rabban Gamaliel of Yavne, the first Nasi of the Sanhedrin after the fall of the Second Temple. (Note: In 1950, following the instructions of J. L. Hacohen Maimon of Israel's Ministry for Religious Affairs regarding the possibility of restoring Muslim edifices in Israel, L. A. Mayer referred specifically to the intriguing memorial at Yavne: "Its legend-creating qualities have lasted till our own days: quite recently we heard of a belief prevalent among Oriental Jews that here is situated the tomb of Rabbi Gamliel of Yavne."The said belief has only gained in strength since then, and over the past three years, during my frequent visits to the site, I have been witness to Rabbi Gamliel's "creeping annexation" of the site, as it were.') The identification of the site as Gamaliel's tomb was based on the literature of medieval Jewish pilgrims, who frequently mentioned visits to the site. The claim of previous Jewish origin was based on the argument that many such maqamat (Muslim sacred tombs) were originally Jewish tombs that had been Islamized during the later history of the region. The Ministry of Religious Services of Israel has maintained authority over the site since 1948, and the structure was thereafter appropriated by Haredi Judaism and transformed into a tomb of the righteous. Gideon Bar cites it as one of many cases of the Judaization of Muslim holy places, where the Jewish heritage of a site has been showcased at the expense of other local cultural traditions.

== Architecture ==
Until 1948 the building stood within a walled compound containing other graves (the compound wall and the graves have since been removed). There were two inscriptions above the gateway; one in the name of Sultan Baybars dated 673 H. (1274 C.E.) and another dated to 806 H. (1403 C.E.).

A cenotaph is located in center of the tomb chamber. The cenotaph is a rectangular structure with four marble corner posts formed as turbans. The four lower courses are made of ashlar blocks, while the upper course is of marble ornamented with niches in Gothic style.

Much of the construction materials of the building are reused Byzantine marble, mainly columns and Corinthian capitals.

== Inscriptions ==
The first inscription, dated 1274, described how Mamluk Sultan Baybars (reigned 1260–77) ordered the construction of the riwaq. It also refers to the Wali of Ramleh, Khalil ibn Sawir, who was named by the chronicler Ibn al-Furat as being responsible for instigating the famed attempted assassination of Edward I of England in June 1272 in the Ninth Crusade.

The second inscription described further construction ordered in 1292 by Mamluk Sultan Al-Ashraf Khalil (reigned 1290–93).

Date	Picture	Location	Translation
673 AH (1274 CE)		Marble slab on door of enclosure	"In the name of the Merciful and Gracious God. Gave the order to begin building the blessed porch (rewak), our master, Sultan El-Malek edh-Dhaher, pillar of the world and of religion, Abou'l Fath (the father of conquest) Beibars, co-sharer with the Emir of the Believers, may God exalt his victories! The completion of it took place in the month Rebi' I, in the year 673. Was entrusted with the building Khalil ibn Shawar, wali of Ramlah, whom may God pardon, him, his father and mother, and all the Mussulmans."
692 AH (1292 CE)		Base of doorway and under the lintel	"In the name of the merciful and compassionate God. Began to build this blessed sanctuary (meshhed) of Abu Horeira, may God receive him, companion of the apostle of God, on whom be prayers and salvation, our Lord and our master the very great, learned, and just Sultan, resolute champion and guardian (of Islam), victorious, El-Malek el-Achraf, prosperity of the world and of religion, Sultan of Islam and of the Mussulmans, lord of Kings and Sultans, Abu'l-Feda Khalil, co-sharer with the Emir of the Believers, may God exalt his victory, son of our master the Sultan, hero of the holy war, El-Malek El-Mansur Kelaun es-Salehy, may God water his reign with the rain of his mercy and his grace and the benefits of his indulgence, may he make him to dwell in the gardens of Eternity, may he come to his aid on the day of resurrection, may he make him a place under a wide shade with abundant water and quantities of fruit without stint, may he grant him the reward and the delights he has deserved, may he raise his places and degrees into the..." "Amen ! The building of it was finished in the months of the year 692, and there was entrusted with its building Aydemir the dewadar ("bearer of the inkstand") Ez,-Zeiny (?) may God pardon him, him and his descendants, as also all Mussulmans."
806 AH (1403 CE)		Marble slab	"Renewed this pool, the conduit and the sakia, his Excellency En-Nasery (= Naser ed-din) Mohammed Anar (?), son of Anar (? ?), and his Excellency El-'Alay (= 'Ala ed-din) Yelbogha, possessors (?) of the township of Yebna, may god in his grace and mercy grant to both of them Paradise as a reward. Ordered at the date of the month Rebi' I, in the year 806."

== Facilities ==
The tomb contains a large hall, offices, and a small Orthodox synagogue. Facilities around the tomb include restrooms, water fountains, a Yahrzeit candelabra, and tables for festive meals (seudat mitzvah). The tomb indication itself is covered with a blue ornamental cloth. The tomb is renowned among some Jews as a matchmaking and fertility site.

== Gallery ==
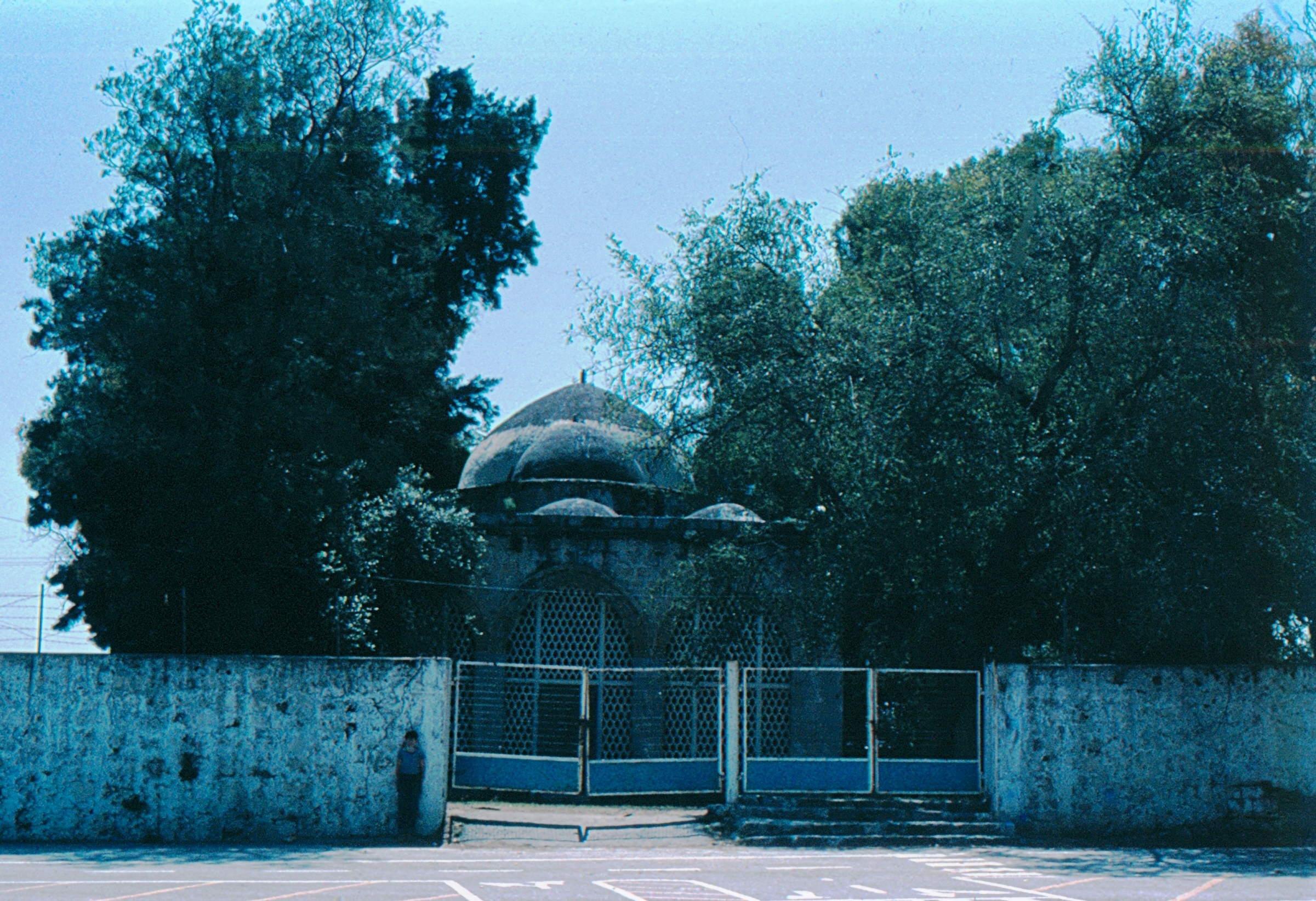
The mausoleum in 1985

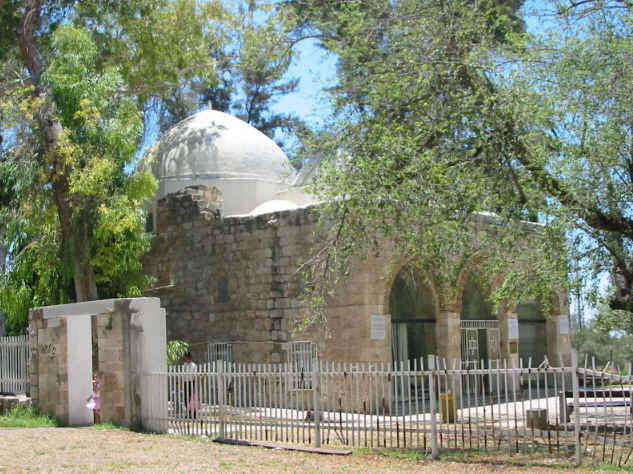
The mausoleum in 2009

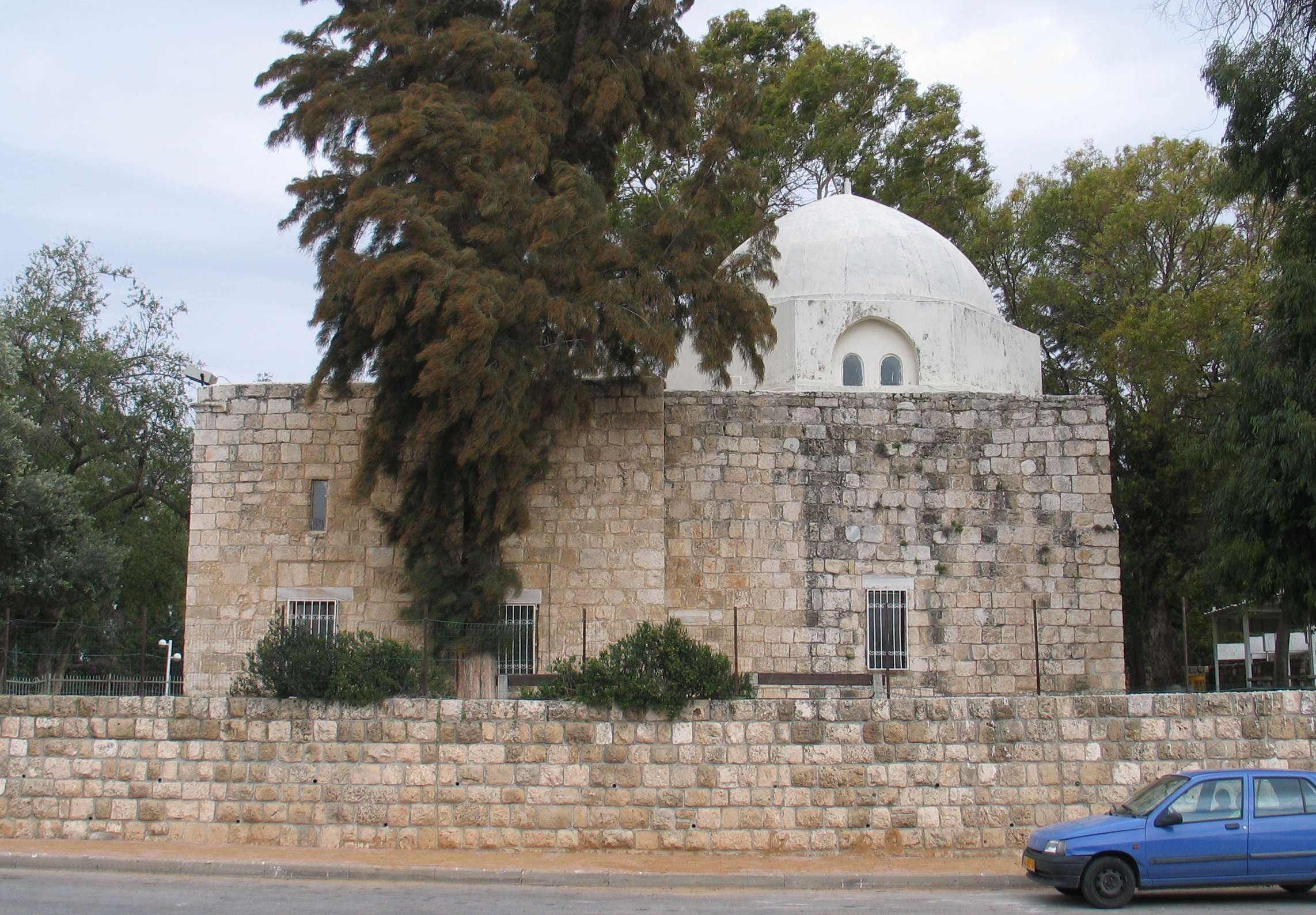
Side view from the east

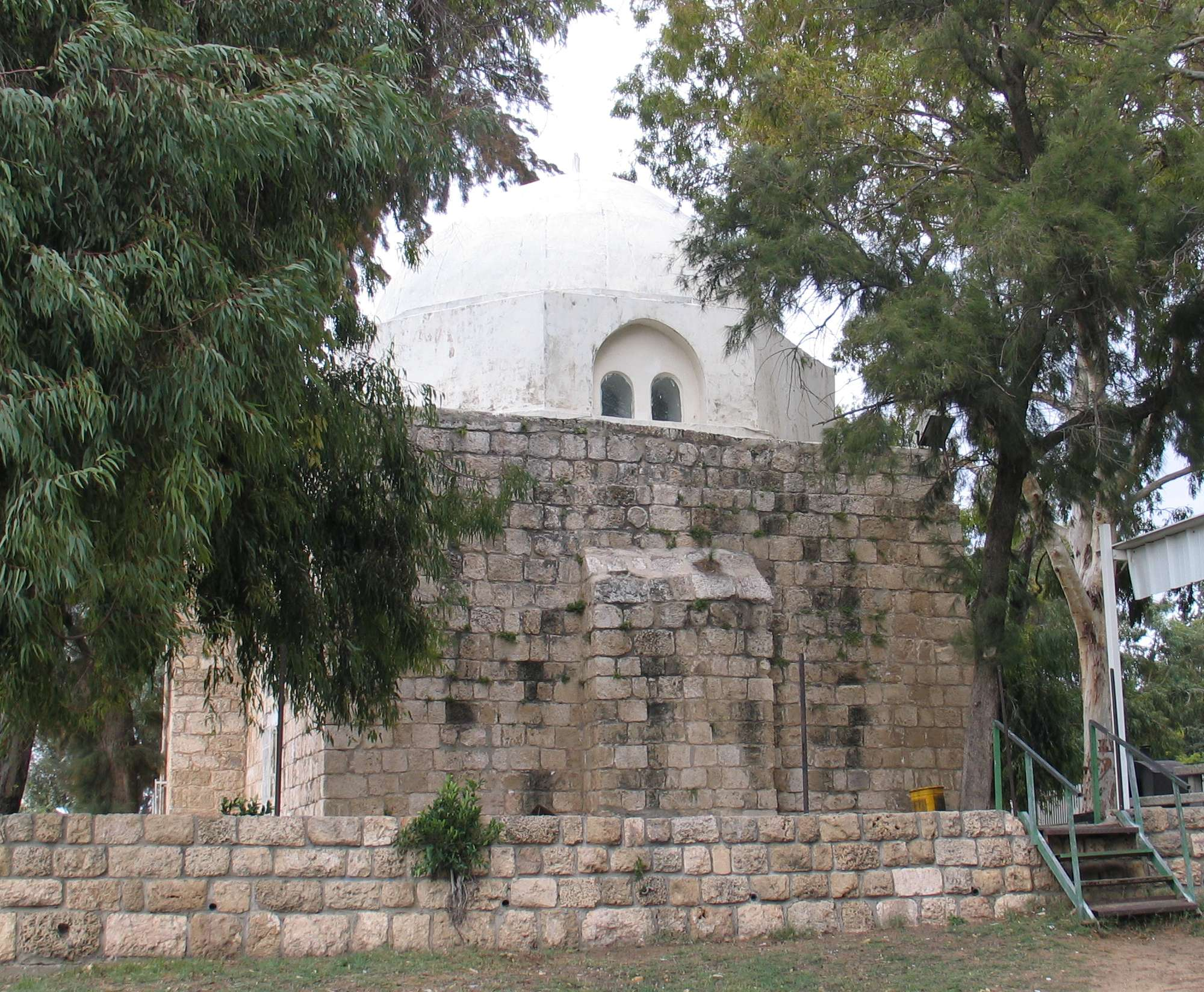
Side view

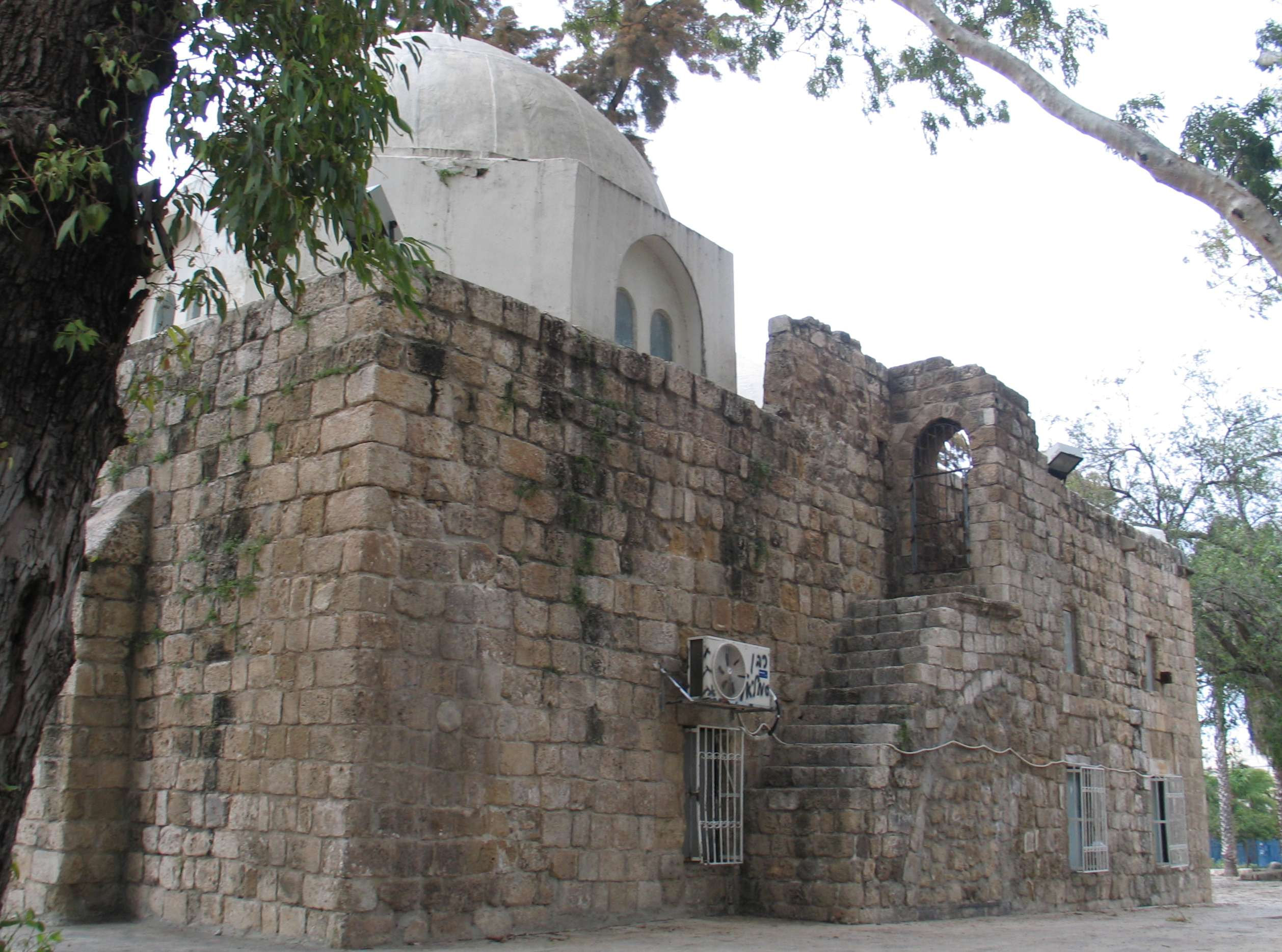
Rear view from south-east, with stairs leading up to the roof

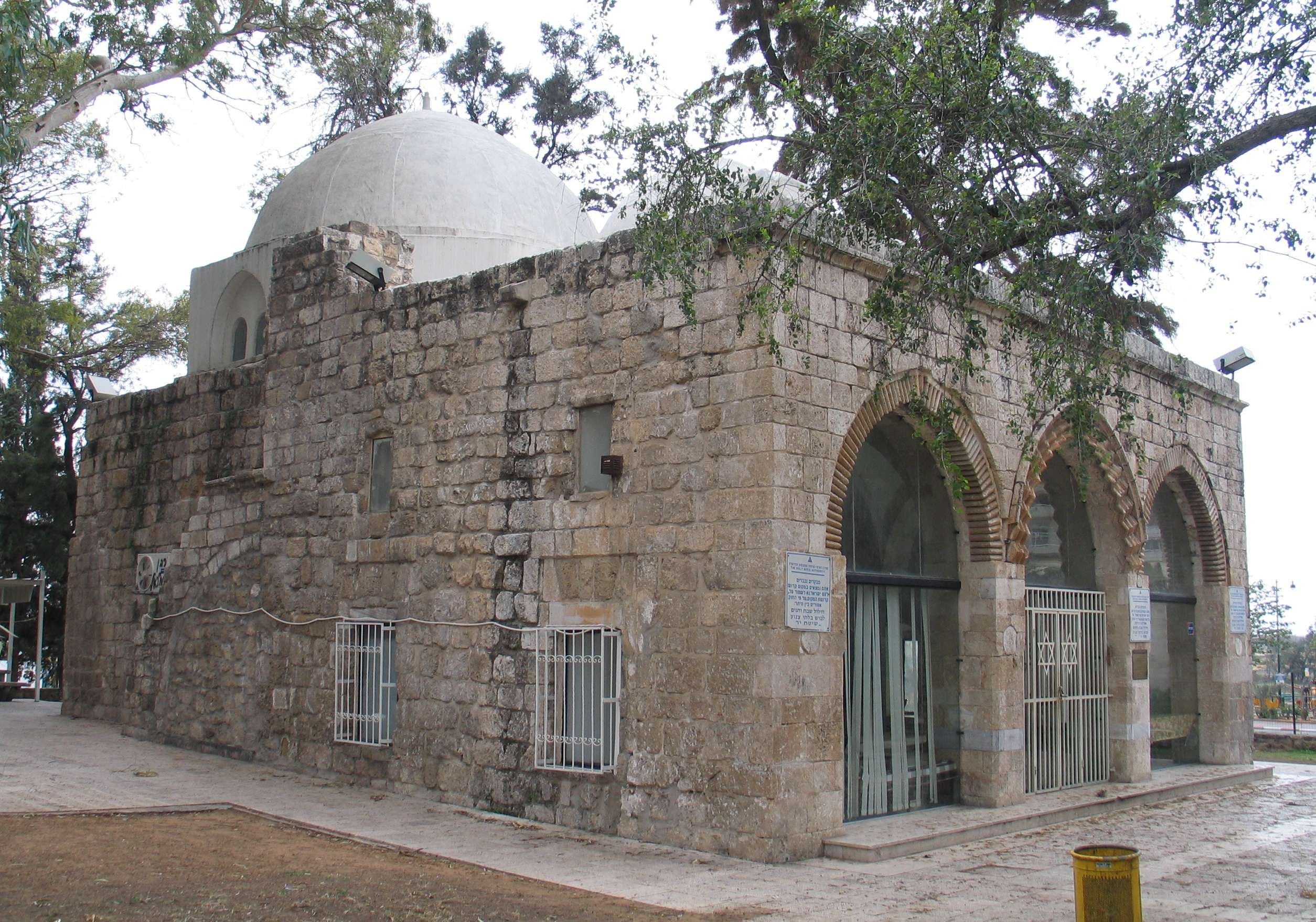
North-east exposure of the tomb structure

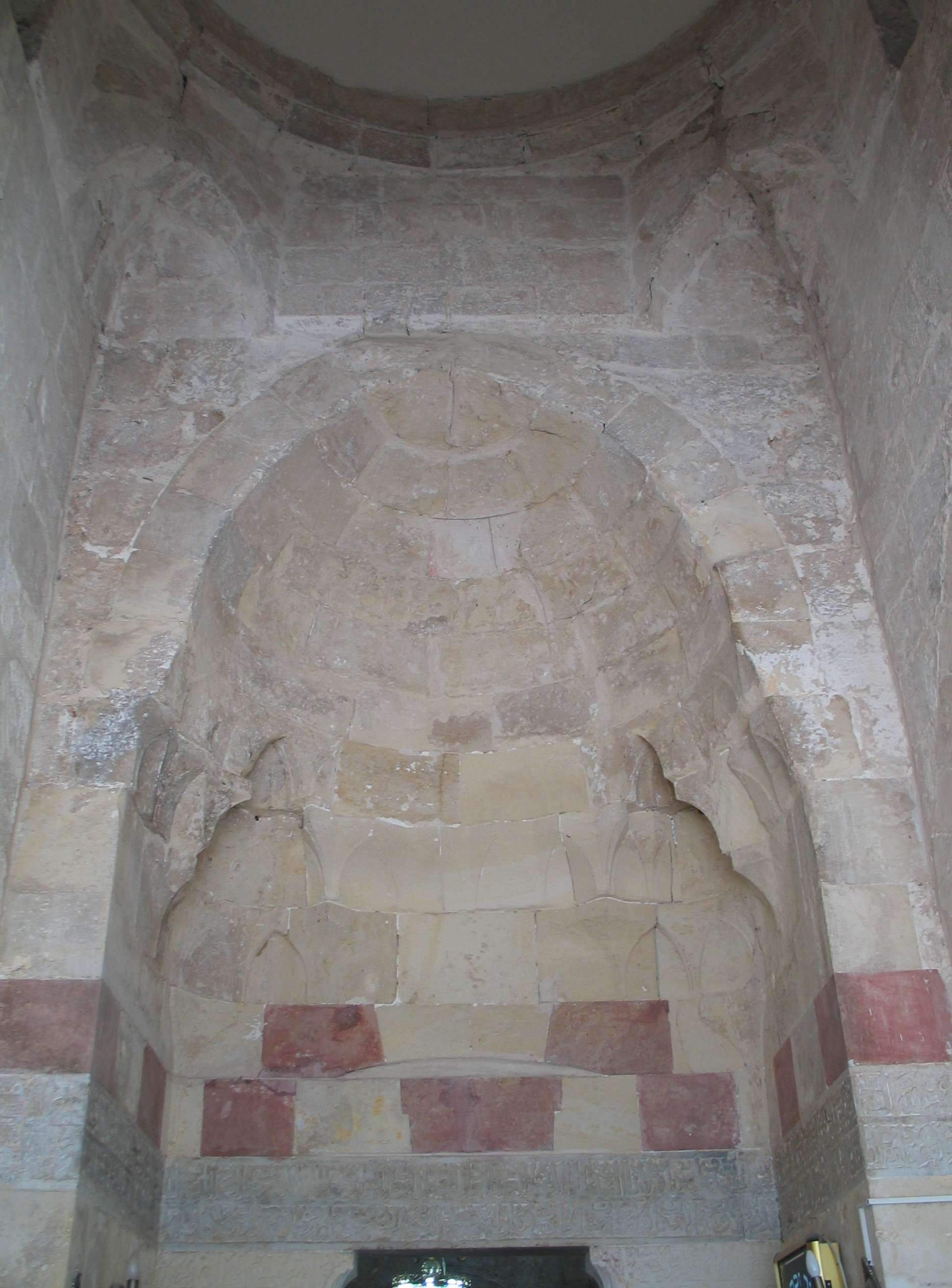
Interior, with faint inscription and ablaq-style masonry

== See also ==
- Gamaliel II
- History of the Jews in Israel
- List of synagogues in Israel
- Yibna
