= Hillel =

Hillel (Hebrew: הלל, lit. 'praise') is a Jewish masculine given name and a surname. It may refer to:

== Given name ==
- Hillel the Elder (110 BC–10 AD), Babylonian sage, scholar, and Jewish leader
- Hillel, son of Gamaliel III (3rd century), Jewish scholar
- Hillel II, Jewish communal and religious authority and Nasi of the Jewish Sanhedrin, 320–385
- Hillel ben Eliakim (11th–12th century), Greek rabbi and Talmud scholar
- Hillel ben Samuel (c. 1220–1295), Italian physician, philosopher, and Talmudist
- Hillel ben Naphtali Zevi (1615–1690), Lithuanian rabbi
- Hillel Rivlin (1758–1838), Lithuanian rabbi
- Hillel Paritcher (1795–1864), Russian Chabad rabbi
- Hillel Lichtenstein (1814–1891), Hungarian rabbi and writer
- Hillel Noah Maggid (1829–1903), Russian-Jewish genealogist and historian
- Hillel Yaffe (1864–1936), Russian Jewish physician and Zionist leader
- Hillel Zeitlin (1871–1942), Russian writer in Yiddish and Hebrew
- Hillel Poisic (1881–1953), Ukrainian communal worker and Torah scholar
- Hillel Oppenheimer (1899–1971), German-Israeli botanist
- Hillel Kook (1915–2001), Russian-Jewish Zionist activist, politician, and leader of the Irgun
- Hillel Seidel (1920–1999), Israeli politician
- Hillel Schwartz (1923–2007), Egyptian Jewish politician; founder of the Iskra party
- Hillel Kristal, birth name of Hilly Kristal (1931–2007), American musician and owner of club CBGB in New York City
- Hillel Zaks (1931–2015), Polish-Israeli founder and rosh yeshiva of Yeshivas Knesses Hagedolah
- Hillel Jonathan Gitelman (1932-2015), American nephrologist who described Gitelman Syndrome
- Hillel Furstenberg (born 1935), American-Israeli mathematician
- Hillel Ticktin (born 1937), South African Marxist theorist and economist now at Glasgow University
- Hillel Halkin (born 1939), American-born Israeli translator, writer, and literary critic
- Hillel Weiss (born 1945), Israeli professor of literature and Neo-Zionist
- Hillel Schwartz (1948-2007), American cultural historian, poet and translator
- Hillel Cohen (born 1961), Israeli historian
- Hillel Slovak (1962–1988), Israeli-American guitarist and founding member of the Red Hot Chili Peppers
- Hillel Horowitz (born 1964), Israeli rabbi and politician
- Hillel Roman (born 1975), American-Israeli visual artist
- Hillel Fendel, Israeli journalist
- Hillel Frisch, Israeli political scientist
- Hillel Neuer, Canadian human-rights lawyer and executive director of UN Watch
- Hillel Schenker, Israeli editor
- Hillel Steiner (born 1942), Canadian political philosopher
- Hillel Fuld, Israeli-American technology advisor and blogger

== Surname ==
- Simeon ben Hillel (1st century), son of Hillel the Elder
- Mordechai ben Hillel (1250–1298), German rabbi and posek
- Abraham Hillel (1820–1920), Iraqi rabbi
- Yehoshua Bar-Hillel (1915–1975), Israeli philosopher, mathematician, and linguist
- Shlomo Hillel (1923-2021), Iraqi-born Israeli diplomat and politician
- Ayin Hillel (1926–1990), Israeli poet and children's author
- Stéphane Hillel (born 1955) French actor
- Gili Bar-Hillel (born 1974) Israeli English-Hebrew translator

== See also ==
- Hallel, a Jewish prayer
