= Holy Land =

Abrahamic term for Israel and Palestine

Holy Land אֶרֶץ הַקּוֹדֶשׁ (Hebrew) Άγιοι Τόποι (Greek) Terra Sancta (Latin) الأرض المقدسة (Arabic)
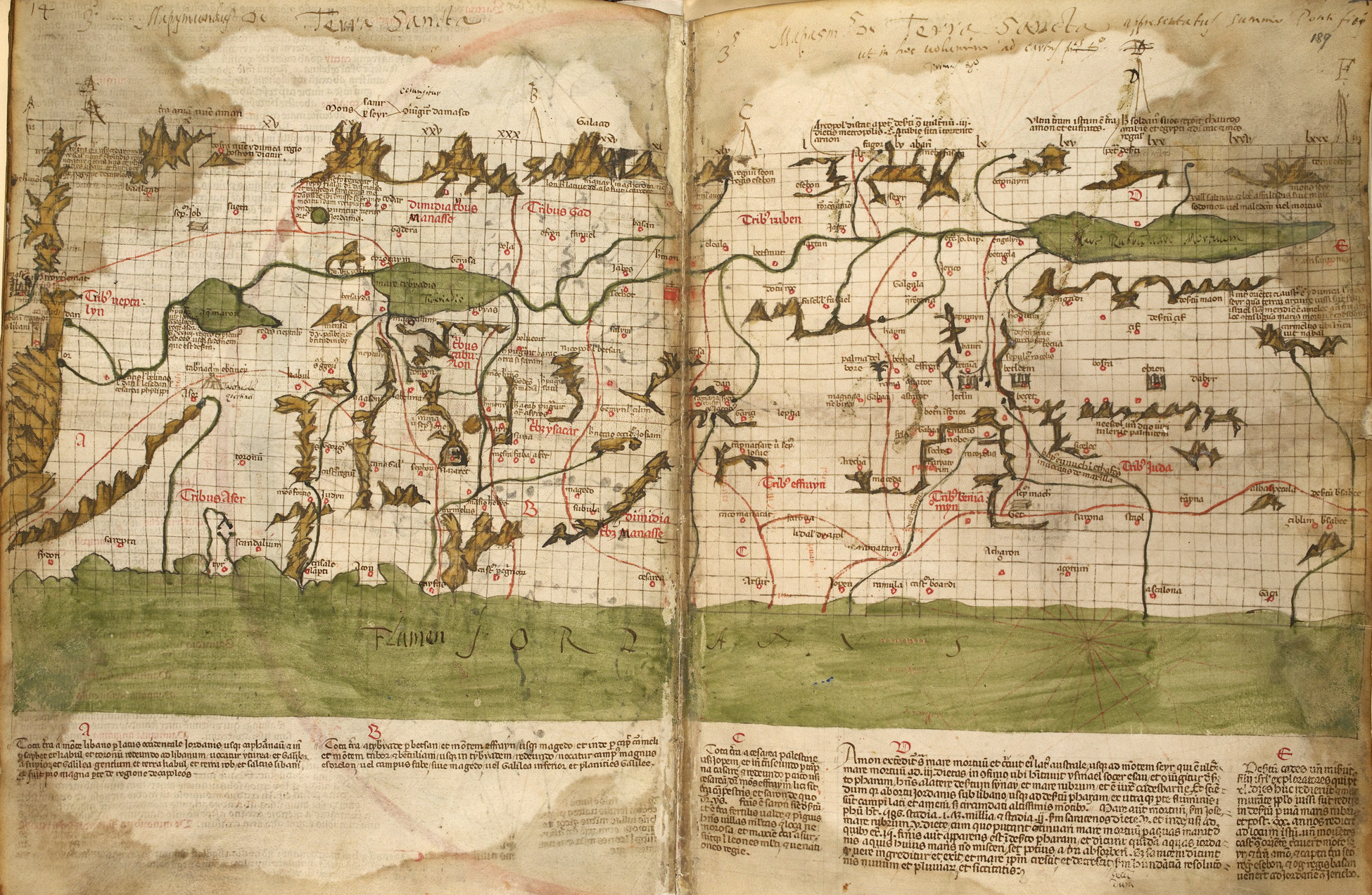
- Map of the Holy Land by Genoese cartographer Pietro Vesconte in 1321, described as "the first non-Ptolemaic map of a definite country" by Swedish explorer Adolf Erik Nordenskiöld in 1889.
- Interactive map of Holy Land אֶרֶץ הַקּוֹדֶשׁ (Hebrew); Άγιοι Τόποι (Greek); Terra Sancta (Latin) الأرض المقدسة (Arabic)
- Type: Sacred ground
- Location: Southern Levant

History
- Original use: The Promised Land, bestowed upon Abraham and his descendants (the Israelites), according to the Abrahamic religions

Site notes
- Current use: Major pilgrimage destination for the Abrahamic world, including Jews, Christians, and Muslims

The term "Holy Land" (Note: Hebrew: אֶרֶץ הַקּוֹדֶשׁ, romanized: Ereṣ haqQōdeš; Greek: Άγιοι Τόποι, romanized: Ágioi Tópoi; Latin: Terra Sancta; Arabic: الأرض المقدسة, romanized: al-Arḍ al-Muqaddasah, or الديار المقدسة, ad-Diyār al-Muqaddasah.) is used to collectively denote areas of the Southern Levant that hold great significance in the Abrahamic religions, primarily because of their association with people and events featured in the Hebrew Bible (Tanakh). The term is traditionally synonymous with what is known as the Land of Israel (Zion) or the Promised Land in a biblical or religious context, or as Canaan or Palestine in a secular or geographic context—referring to a region that is mostly between the Mediterranean Sea and the Jordan River. Today, it chiefly overlaps with the combined areas of modern-day Israel and Palestine, and also include parts of Lebanon, Jordan, and Syria. Judaism, Christianity, and Islam attach substantial spiritual value to the Holy Land.

A considerable part of the Holy Land's importance derives from Jerusalem, which is regarded as extremely sacred in and of itself. It is the holiest city in Judaism and Christianity and the third-holiest city in Islam (behind Mecca and Medina in the Arabian Peninsula). The Temple in Jerusalem, referring to Solomon's Temple and the Second Temple, was the central place of worship for Israelites and Jews and serves as the namesake of the Temple Mount. According to the Hebrew Bible, Jerusalem was made the capital city of the Kingdom of Israel and Judah under the House of David, thereafter being inherited by the Kingdom of Judah alone. Jesus of Nazareth, first brought to Jerusalem to be presented at the Second Temple shortly after his birth, was also highly active throughout the city during his life as a preacher. In Islamic belief, Isra' and Mi'raj refer to a night journey by Muhammad to the Holy Land, with the supernatural "Buraq" transporting him from Mecca's Masjid al-Haram to Jerusalem's Al-Aqsa Mosque, where he ascended to heaven and met God and past Islamic prophets and messengers; Jerusalem also served as the qibla (direction of Muslim prayers) prior to Mecca's Kaaba fulfilling that role.

Historically, the Holy Land is notable for being the site of numerous religious wars. In the Middle Ages, the Christian pilgrimage, which involves visiting sites associated with Jesus or his disciples, contributed to the beginning of the Crusades, launched under the banner of restoring Christian sovereignty in the region after it was lost to the early Muslim conquests. In the 19th century, the Holy Land again became the subject of international diplomatic wrangling as part of the "Eastern Question" with regard to the Ottoman Empire, culminating in the Crimean War in the 1850s. Around the same period, the emergence of Zionism, a nationalist ideology that tapped into Jewish aspirations to recover the Land of Israel, spurred a sizable portion of the Jewish diaspora to begin working towards the development of the region as the Jewish homeland. Eventually, following numerous waves of Jewish immigration, the Zionist movement issued the Israeli Declaration of Independence in May 1948, triggering the First Arab–Israeli War. Since then, the Holy Land's religious and political atmosphere has been dominated by the Israeli–Palestinian conflict.

Pilgrimage and other religious activity in the Holy Land has long been central to the Judeo-Christian tradition and other Abrahamic religions. Restrictions on entry to the Temple Mount in the Old City of Jerusalem have been recurrent since the Ottoman era, with Jordan and Israel currently splitting responsibility of the site's administration. A number of sites are contested between certain groups, but subject to the "Status Quo" in Jerusalem and Bethlehem that effectively bars even the most minuscule changes in their status without universal consensus from the relevant religious parties. Pilgrims from all parts of the Abrahamic world visit the Holy Land to touch and see physical manifestations of their faith, to confirm their beliefs in the holy context with collective excitation, and to establish a personal connection with the sites in order to strengthen their sense of spirituality.

== Judaism ==
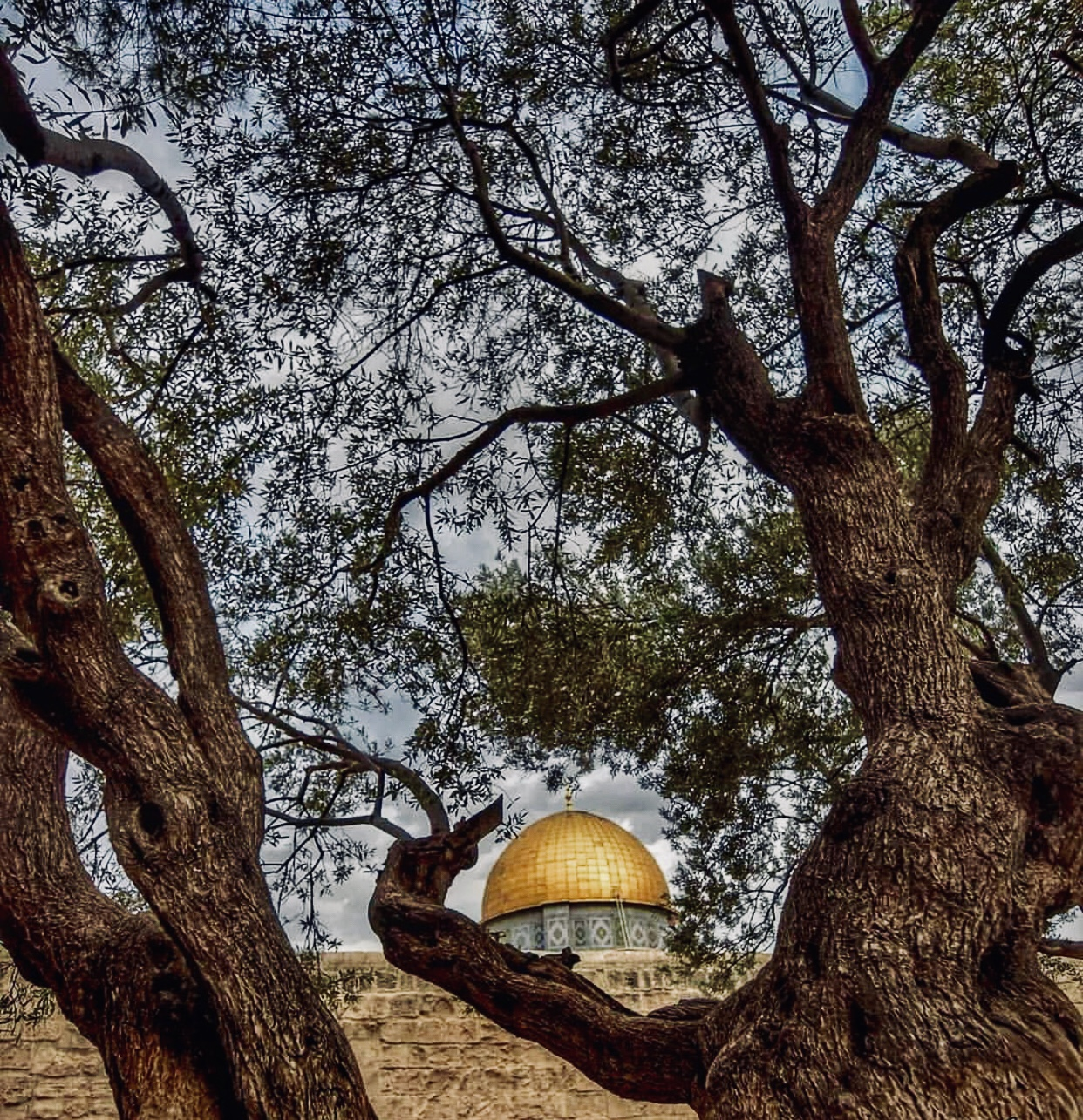
Olive trees, like this one in Jerusalem, have intrinsic symbolism in Judaism, Christianity, and Islam.

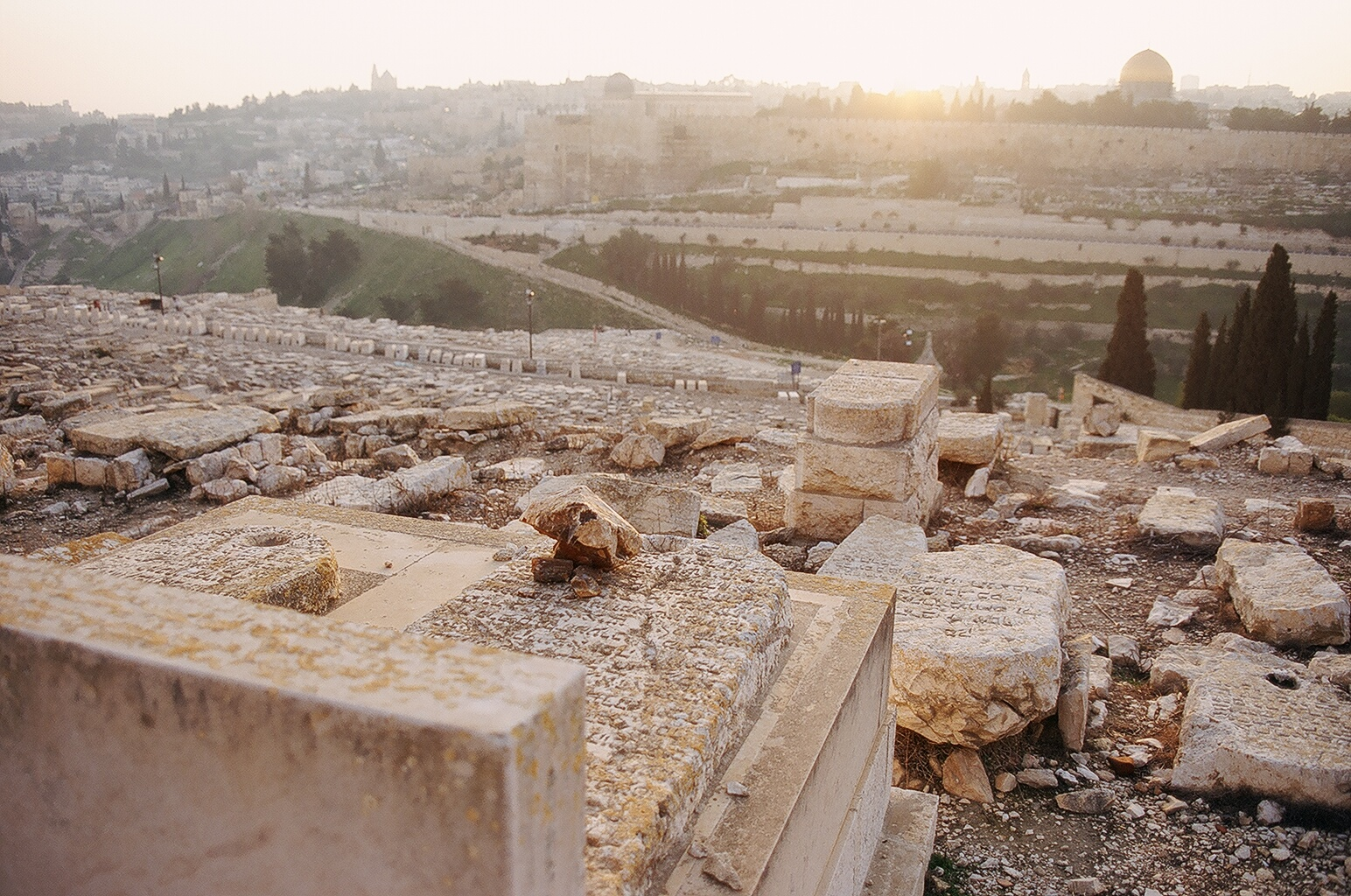
Jewish cemetery on the Mount of Olives, Jerusalem. The holiness of Israel attracted Jews to be buried in its holy soil. The sage Rabbi Anan said "To be buried in Israel is like being buried under the altar."

The Holy Land is known in Hebrew as Eretz HaKodesh (אֶרֶץ הַקוֹדֵשׁ), a term generally used by Jews for the Land of Israel. Researchers consider that the concept of a land made holy by being the "earthly dwelling of the God of Israel" was present in Judaism at the latest by the time of Zechariah (6th century BCE). The Tanakh explicitly refers to it as "holy land" in Zechariah 2:16. The term "holy land" is further used twice in the deuterocanonical books (Wisdom 12:3, 2 Maccabees 1:7). The holiness of the Land of Israel is generally implied by the Tanakh's claim that the Land was given to the Israelites by God, that is, it is the "Promised Land", an integral part of God's covenant.

In the Torah, many mitzvot commanded to the Israelites can only be performed in the Land of Israel, which serves to differentiate it from other lands. For example, in the Land of Israel, "no land shall be sold permanently" (Leviticus 25:23). Shmita is only observed with respect to the Land of Israel, and the observance of many holy days is different, as an extra day is observed in the Jewish diaspora.

According to Eliezer Schweid:

The uniqueness of the Land of Israel is...'geo-theological' and not merely climatic. This is the land which faces the entrance of the spiritual world, that sphere of existence that lies beyond the physical world known to us through our senses. This is the key to the land's unique status with regard to prophecy and prayer, and also with regard to the commandments.

From the perspective of the 1906 Jewish Encyclopedia, the holiness of Israel had been concentrated since the sixteenth century, especially for burial, in the "Four Holy Cities": Jerusalem, Hebron, Safed and Tiberias – as Judaism's holiest cities. Jerusalem, as the site of the Temple, is considered especially significant. Sacred burials are still undertaken for diaspora Jews who wish to lie buried in the holy soil of Israel.

According to Jewish tradition, Jerusalem is Mount Moriah, the location of the binding of Isaac. The Hebrew Bible mentions the name "Jerusalem" 669 times, often because many mitzvot can only be performed within its environs. The name "Zion", which usually refers to Jerusalem, but sometimes the Land of Israel, appears in the Hebrew Bible 154 times.

The Talmud mentions the religious duty of populating Israel. So significant in Judaism is the act of purchasing land in Israel, the Talmud allows for the lifting of certain religious restrictions of Sabbath observance to further its acquisition and settlement. Rabbi Johanan said that "Whoever walks four cubits in Eretz Yisrael [the Land of Israel] is guaranteed entrance to the World to Come". A story says that when R. Eleazar b. Shammua' and R. Johanan HaSandlar left Israel to study from R. Judah ben Bathyra, they only managed to reach Sidon when "the thought of the sanctity of Palestine overcame their resolution, and they shed tears, rent their garments, and turned back". Due to the Jewish population being concentrated in Israel, emigration was generally prevented, which resulted in a limiting of the amount of space available for Jewish learning. However, after suffering persecutions in Israel for centuries after the destruction of the Temple, Rabbis who had found it very difficult to retain their position moved to Babylon, which offered them better protection. Many Jews wanted Israel to be the place where they died, in order to be buried there. The sage Rabbi Anan said "To be buried in Israel is like being buried under the altar." The saying "His land will absolve His people" implies that burial in Israel will cause one to be absolved of all one's sins.

== Christianity ==
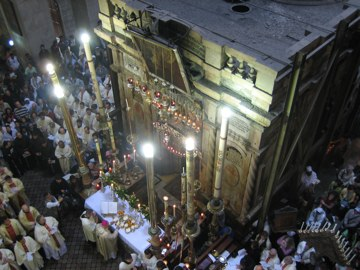
The Church of the Holy Sepulchre is one of the most important pilgrimage sites in Christianity, as it is the purported site of Christ's resurrection.

For Christians, the Holy Land is considered holy because of its association with the birth, ministry, crucifixion and resurrection of Jesus, whom Christians regard as the incarnation of God and the Messiah. A collection of places associated with significant events in the life of Jesus and his followers, known as the Holy Places, is maintained for Christian pilgrimage and mission purposes and for local community support. A universal annual collection in the Catholic church provides financial support for the "Holy Places".

Christian books, including many editions of the Bible, often have maps of the Holy Land (considered to include the regions of Galilee, Samaria, and Judea). For instance, the Itinerarium Sacrae Scripturae (lit. 'Travel book through Holy Scripture') of Heinrich Bünting (1545–1606), a German Protestant pastor, featured such a map. His book was very popular, and it provided "the most complete available summary of biblical geography and described the geography of the Holy Land by tracing the travels of major figures from the Old and New testaments".

== Islam ==
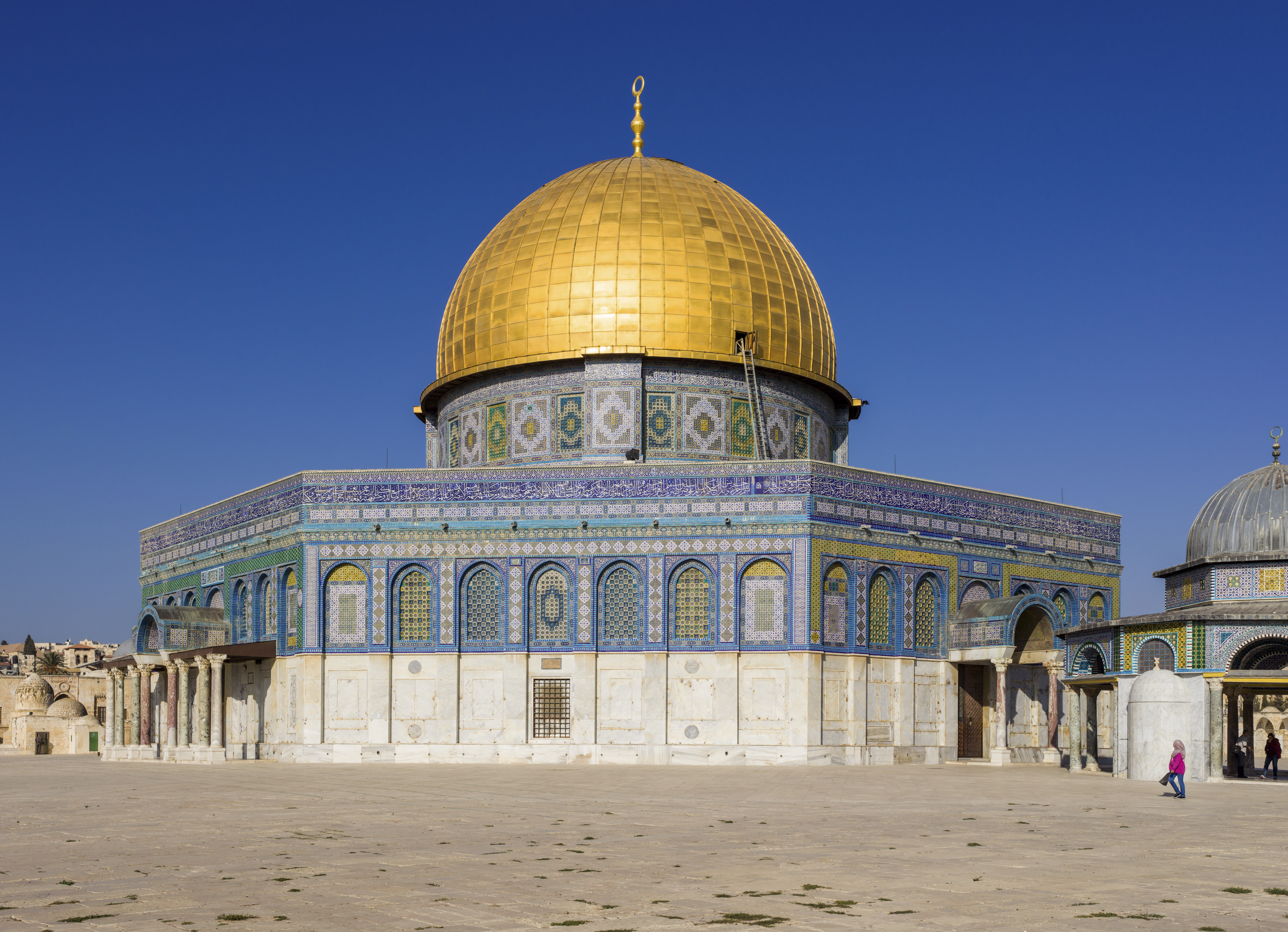
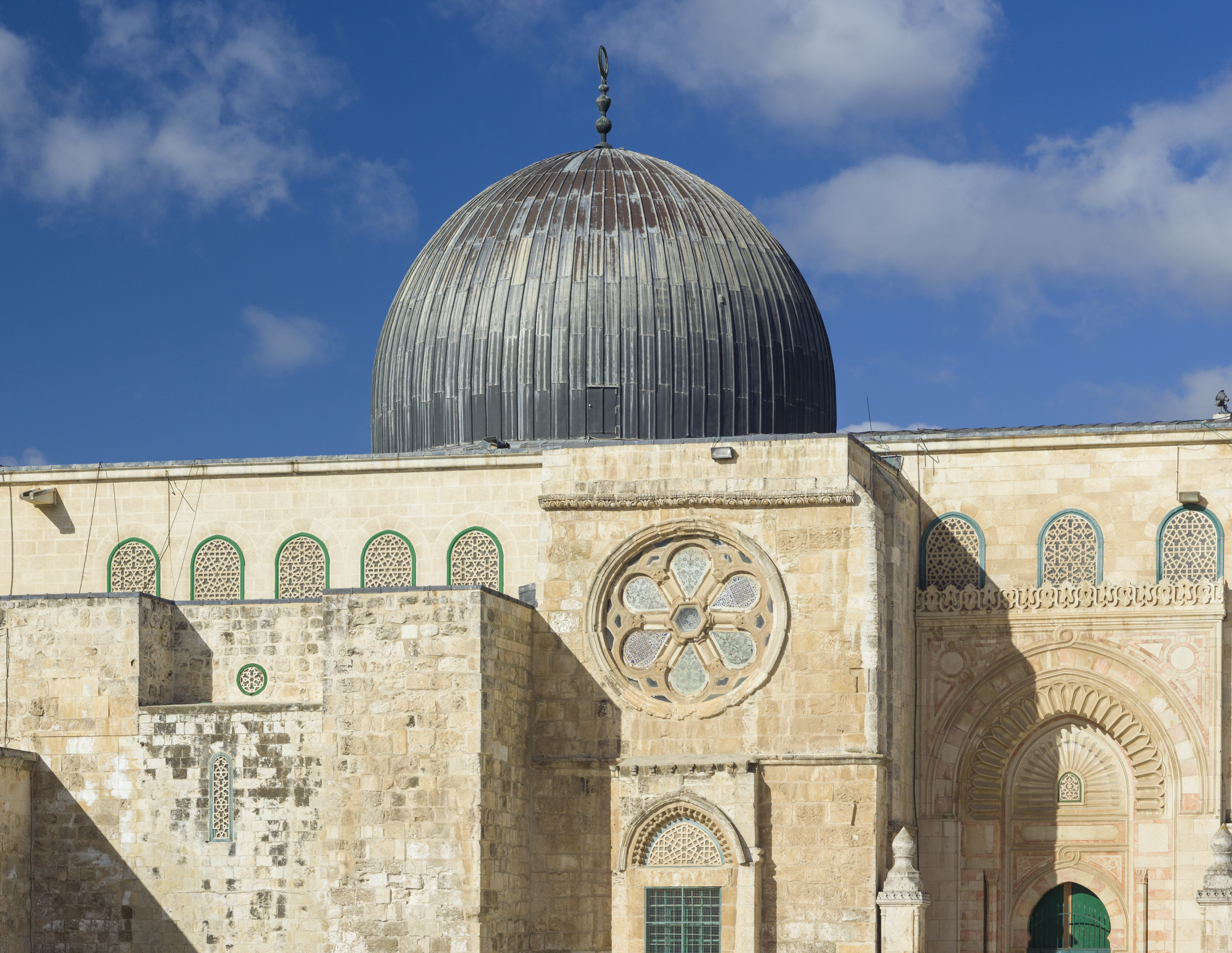
Dome of the Rock (left) and Masjid Al-Qibli (right). The mosque was Islam's first direction of prayer (Qibla), and Muslims believe that Muhammad ascended to heaven from there

In the Quran, the Arabic term for the Holy Land, Al-Ard Al-Muqaddasah (الأرض المقدسة), is used in a passage about Musa (Moses) proclaiming to the Children of Israel: "O my people! Enter the Holy Land which Allah has destined for you ˹to enter˺. And do not turn back or else you will become losers."^{[Quran 5:21]} The Quran also refers to the land as being 'Blessed'.

Jerusalem, known in Arabic as Al-Quds (الـقُـدس, English: The Holy), has particular significance in Islam. The Quran refers to Muhammad's experiencing the Isra and Mi'raj as "Glory be to the One Who took His servant ˹Muḥammad˺ by night from the Sacred Mosque to the Farthest Mosque whose surroundings We have blessed, so that We may show him some of Our signs".^{[Quran 17:1]} Ahadith infer that the "Farthest Masjid" is in Al-Quds; for example, as narrated by Abu Hurairah: "On the night journey of the Apostle of Allah, two cups, one containing wine and the other containing milk, were presented to him at Al-Quds (Jerusalem). He looked at them and took the cup of milk. Angel Gabriel said, 'Praise be to Allah, who guided you to Al-Fitrah (the right path); if you had taken (the cup of) wine, your Ummah would have gone astray'." Jerusalem was Islam's first Qiblah (direction of prayer) in Muhammad's lifetime, however, this was later changed to the Kaaba in the Hijazi city of Mecca, following a revelation to Muhammad by the Archangel Jibril. The Al-Aqsa Mosque, which lies on the Temple Mount in Jerusalem, is dated to the early Umayyad period of rule in Palestine. Architectural historian K. A. C. Creswell, referring to a testimony by Arculf, a Gallic monk, during his pilgrimage to Palestine in 679–82, notes the possibility that the second caliph of the Rashidun Caliphate, Umar ibn al-Khattab, erected a primitive quadrangular building for a capacity of 3,000 worshipers somewhere on the Haram ash-Sharif. However, Arculf visited Palestine during the reign of Mu'awiyah I, and it is possible that Mu'awiyah ordered the construction, not Umar. This latter claim is explicitly supported by the early Muslim scholar al-Muthahhar bin Tahir. According to the Quran and Islamic traditions, Al-Aqsa Mosque is the place from which Muhammad went on a night journey (al-isra) during which he rode on Buraq, who took him from Mecca to al-Aqsa. Muhammad tethered Buraq to the Western Wall and prayed at al-Aqsa Mosque and after he finished his prayers, the angel Jibril (Gabriel) traveled with him to heaven, where he met several other prophets and led them in prayer. The historical significance of the al-Aqsa Mosque in Islam is further emphasized by the fact that Muslims turned towards al-Aqsa when they prayed for a period of 16 or 17 months after migration to Medina in 624; it thus became the qibla ('direction') that Muslims faced for prayer.

The exact region referred to as being 'blessed' in the Quran, in verses like 17:1, 21:71 and 34:18, has been interpreted differently by various scholars. Abdullah Yusuf Ali likens it to a wide land-range including Syria and Lebanon, especially the cities of Tyre and Sidon; Az-Zujaj describes it as "Damascus, Palestine, and a bit of Jordan"; Muadh ibn Jabal as "the area between al-Arish and the Euphrates"; and Ibn Abbas as "the land of Jericho". This overall region is referred to as "Ash-Shām" (Arabic: الـشَّـام).

== Baháʼí Faith ==
The holiest places for Baháʼí pilgrimage are the Shrine of Bahá'u'lláh and the Shrine of the Báb, which are UNESCO World Heritage Sites in the coastal cities of Acre and Haifa, respectively.

The Baháʼí Faith's founder, Bahá'u'lláh, was exiled to Acre Prison from 1868 and spent his life in its surroundings until his death in 1892. In his writings he set the slope of Mount Carmel to host the Shrine of the Báb which his appointed successor 'Abdu'l-Bahá erected in 1909 as a beginning of the terraced gardens there. The Head of the religion after him, Shoghi Effendi, began building other structures and the Universal House of Justice continued the work until the Bahá'í World Centre was brought to its current state as the spiritual and administrative centre of the religion. Its gardens are highly popular places to visit and Mohsen Makhmalbaf's 2012 film The Gardener featured them.

== See also ==
- Archaeological sites in Israel
- Crusader states
- History of Palestine
- History of the Jews and Judaism in the Land of Israel
- Holiest sites in Islam
- Holy places
- List of religious sites
- Laws and customs of the Land of Israel in Judaism
- Rivers of Paradise, sometimes associated with a religious concept of the Holy Land
