= Eduyot (Talmud) =

Tractate Eduyot (Hebrew: עדויות, lit. "testimonies") is the seventh tractate in the order Nezikin of the Mishnah.

When, after the destruction of the Temple, it became necessary, through the removal of R. Gamaliel II from the office of patriarch, to decide religious questions by the will of the majority, there was produced, as the groundwork of the treatise Eduyot, a collection of unassailable traditions. From time to time more material was added to this groundwork, until the treatise was concluded on the redaction of the whole Mishnah. There is no connection between the many subjects touched upon in the Eduyot; and an exhaustive discussion of each is not its purpose. Even the names of the sages responsible for the halakhot provide but a loose thread of union.

== Mishnah ==
Following is a synopsis of the longer portions of the treatise:

- Chapter 1: In 1:1-3 a matter of dispute between Hillel and Shammai is again brought up for consideration; namely, the chief rules to be observed in regard to niddah, ḥallah, and mikveh. In 1:7-11 the schools bring forward various decisions relating either to ritual purity or to priestly tithes ("tohorot," "zera'im"). In 1:12-14 a group of laws is given in which the Hillelites incline to the opinion of the Shammaites.
- Chapters 2-3: Insertions in which Hanina Segan ha-Kohanim reports concerning certain customs in the Temple and other precedents at Jerusalem (2:1-3). Each mishnah consists of three halakhot, which were propounded by Rabbi Yishmael or in his school, or by Rabbi Akiva or in his house of learning (4-8); they are followed by two aggadic teachings of Akiva (9-10). In chapter 3 space is given to Dosa ben Harkinas, who was prominent in the disputes with Gamaliel; and matters relating to tohorot and zera'im are treated together with a marriage law. In 7-12 the thread dropped in chapter 2 is taken up again: it contains four questions disputed by Joshua; three by Zadok; four by Gamaliel (besides two groups of his teachings, each group consisting of three parts, which reconcile the conflicting opinions of the two schools); and three by Gamaliel's colleague, Eleazar ben Azariah.
- Chapter 4: Continues 1:12-14 by giving the exceptional cases. Here the Shammaites appear as putting a milder construction upon the Law than the Hillelites (4:1-12).
- Chapter 5: Gives other laws in which the Hillelites and Shammaites take a stand similar to that taken in the earlier chapters. These halakhot are severally mentioned by Judah, Jose, Ishmael, and Eliezer (1-6).
- Chapter 6: The opinions of new colleagues of Jose, Joshua, and Eliezer are given in continuation of chapter 3, partly covering the same subject (1-3).
- Chapter 7: Joshua and Judah again appear (1-7), and Gamaliel's halakhot are given on the consecration of the new moon and of the leap-year, a subject of dispute at the time. In 8-9 the opinions of older colleagues are given.
- Chapter 8: The opinions of members of Bnei Bathyra (1, 3) and of important contemporaries and older teachers (2, 4) are presented; also a halakhah of Akiva on a marriage law, already treated, and a statement of Joshua on the future mission of the prophet (5). To this the opinions of other teachers are added. The tractate closes with an ethical teaching: "The wise men say, Elijah will not appear in order to draw some nigh and to keep others away, but in order to bring peace into the world: 'Behold, I will send you Elijah the prophet before the coming of the great and dreadful day of the Lord: And he shall turn the heart of the fathers to the children, and the heart of the children to their fathers' (Malachi 3:23-24 [A. V. 4:5-6])."

The space in this tractate allotted to each of the teachers is in proportion to his importance; and the frequent occurrence of Akiva's name is justified by the great conciliatory part which he took in the disputes of the time.

A synopsis of some of the insertions follows:

- In 1:4-6 this question is put: "Why are not the names given of the authors of those halakhot which are not accepted?" The answer is: "To show that after a clearer insight they withdraw their opinions and do not abide by them stubbornly; or they are used as sources to serve as precedents in certain cases."
- In 5:6 Akabia ben Mahalalel is cited as having firmly adhered to his opinion; but at his death he bade his son yield to the majority.
- In 2:9-10 and 8:6-7 are sayings to encourage the people for the loss of the Temple.

== Tosefta ==
The Tosefta to Eduyot generally follows the order observed in the Mishnah. After the introductory halakhot (Tosefta 1:1-3 = Mishnah 1:1-3) and the peace exhortations (Tosefta 1:4-6 = Mishnah 1:4-6), those cases mentioned in Mishnah 1:12 are taken up in which the Hillelites yield to the Shammaites (Tosefta 1:6), the disputes between the schools being omitted. Teachings follow (Tosefta 1:8-14 = Mishnah ii. 5-10) advising a wise and moderate limitation of individual opinions where certainty is lacking in cases of dispute. After a short selection from the third chapter of the Mishnah (Tosefta 1:16-18 = Mishnah 3:3,6,7), consideration is given to the occasional milder constructions of the Shammaites and the severer ones of the Hillelites (Tosefta 2:2-9 = Mishnah 4:6,7,11; 5:1,3-5). In Tosefta 2:9, the exceptional opinion of Akavia (Mishnah 5:6,7) is considered. Tosefta 2:10 (= Mishnah 6:3) and 3:1 (= 7:2) touch briefly upon the chief opponents of Gamaliel. Tosefta 3:2,3 (= Mishnah 8:5) gives laws of purification which have reference to the position of Jerusalem after the destruction. The conclusion (Tosefta 3:4) agrees with Mishnah 8:7. Tosefta 1:7, 2:1-2, and 2:6 do not wholly fit into this tractate. The last paragraph is a fragment from the Mishnah of Eliezer ben Jacob.

In general, the Tosefta took as a basis a treatise which dealt only with the chief questions regarding the day called "bo ba-yom" (that day); but the Mishnah of Eduyot is of a wider range.
