= Hananiah ben Akavia =

Hananiah ben Akavia was a rabbi of the second century (fourth generation of tannaim).

== Name ==
Despite his prominence, both parts of his name are uncertain: "Hananiah" and "Hanina" for the former, and "Akabia" and "Akiba" for the latter, appearing promiscuously in connection with one and the same halakhah. However, there is reason to believe that "'Akabia" is his right patronymic, and that he was the son of Akabia ben Mahalalel.

Sometimes Hananiah (or Hanina) is cited without his patronymic. Thus, he is easily confused with Haninah ben Ahi R. Joshua, who is also cited without his patronymic. To avoid such mistakes, one must observe the associates cited in the debate or statement. If these belong to the age of Rabbis Meir, Jose, and Shimon, Hananiah ben Akavia is meant; if they are of a former generation, R. Joshua's nephew is intended.

== Biography ==
He was a contemporary of Judah bar Ilai, and probably one of the younger pupils of Gamaliel II. His name rarely appears in connection with aggadot, but he was firmly grounded in halakhah. Rav expresses great admiration for Hananiah's abilities.

Hananiah was fearless in the expression of his opinions, and also opposed those of the leaders of academies, the "nasi" and his deputy. He lived at Tiberias, where he abrogated many restrictions which had hampered the comfort of the people.
