= Zlatopil =

Zlatopil or Zlatopol is a toponym (place name) in Ukraine. It may refer to:

== Cities ==
- Zlatopil, Novomyrhorod, a former city in central Ukraine
- Zlatopil, Kharkiv Oblast, formerly known as Pervomaiskyi
