= Collection for the Holy Places =

Annual Catholic collection for the Holy Land

Collection for the Holy Places Collecta pro Locis Sanctis
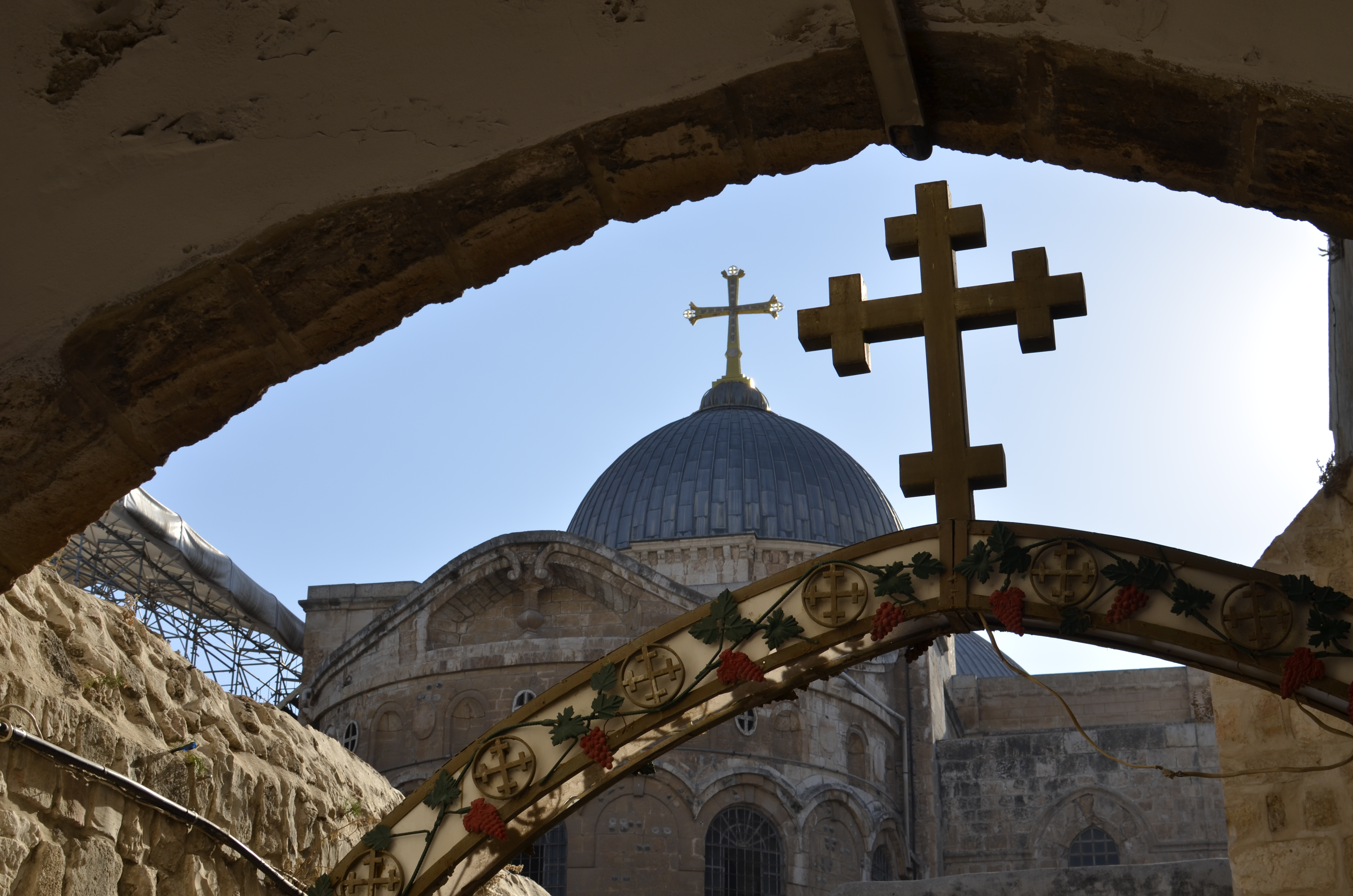
- The Church of the Holy Sepulchre in Jerusalem
- Nickname: Good Friday Collection
- Status: Active
- Frequency: Annually on Good Friday
- Founder: Pope Urban VIII
- Most recent: April 18, 2025
- Next event: April 3, 2026
- Organizer: Pope Leo XIV
- Website: Official website

The Collection for the Holy Places (Latin: Collecta pro Locis Sanctis), also known as the Good Friday Collection, is an annual collection, taken up at the request of the pope, in Catholic churches around the world for the support of Christians in the Holy Land. Dating back to the seventeenth century and reaffirmed by Pope Paul VI in 1974, it is traditionally taken on Good Friday.

== History ==
After the last Crusaders were driven from Acre in 1291, much of the secular clergy in the Holy Land followed them. The only clergy who remained were the Franciscans, who were entrusted with the guardianship of the churches and Christians of the Holy Land. So important was the work of the Franciscans, in 1622 Pope Gregory XV decreed that misdirecting alms bound for Holy Land was an excommunicable offense. Pope Urban VIII bound all prelates, under pain of mortal sin, that three collections were to be taken up each year in their dioceses for the Holy Land. Pope Innocent XI and Pope Alexander VIII issued similar decrees, Pope Benedict XIII reduced the number of collections to two, and mandated that one be taken up in Advent and the other in Lent. He also imposed the obligation for bishops to report during their ad limina visits their actions for this matter. Pope Leo XIII, in his 1887 decree Salvatoris ac Domini Nostri, ruled that all bishops throughout the world were bound by holy obedience to take up a collection at least once a year on Good Friday, or some other day, to be delivered to the Custos of the Holy Land.

Pope Paul VI issued an apostolic exhortation Nobis in animo in 1974, formally establishing the "Pro Terra Sancta" fund. The exhortation avoided a political slant and made no mention of the State of Israel, but nonetheless spoke of the plight of Arab Christians. It reaffirmed the annual collection and added that it was not only for the maintenance of churches, but the "pastoral, charitable, educational, and social works" of the Church in the Holy Land, redirecting the focus from the upkeep of buildings to the Christian community in the Holy Land.

== Current usage ==
The annual Good Friday collection is the primary source of financial support for Christian life in the Holy Land. Territories benefitting from the collection include Jerusalem, Palestine, Israel, Jordan, Cyprus, Syria, Lebanon, Egypt, Ethiopia, Eritrea, Turkey, Iran and Iraq. The Custody of the Holy Land receives 65% of the collection; the Dicastery for the Eastern Churches receives 35%, with assistance going to Bethlehem University, other schools in the Middle East, and seminary formation. In 2024, the collection raised $7.1 million.
