= Zlatopil, Novomyrhorod =

Former city in Ukraine

Zlatopil Златопіль
- City
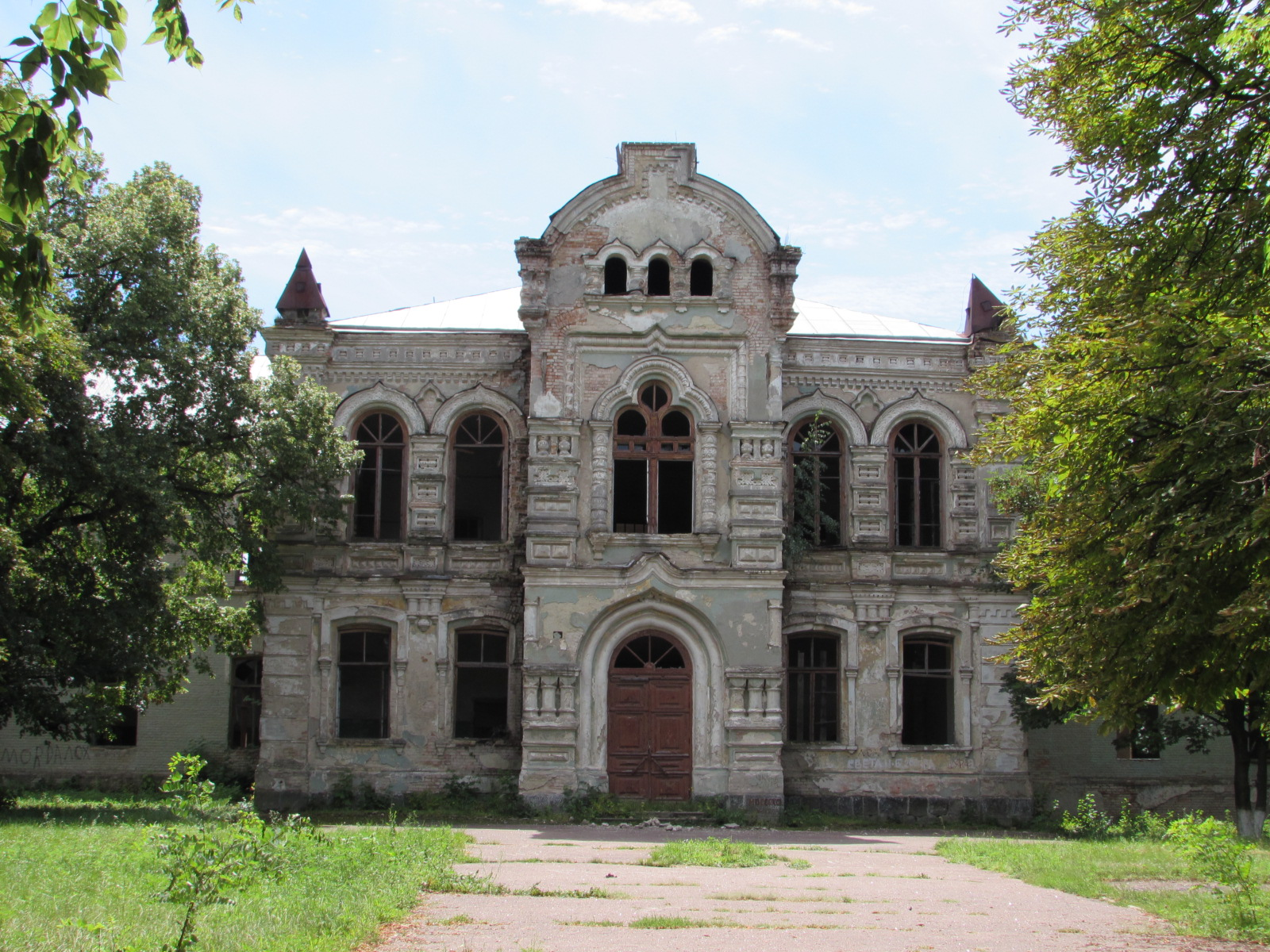
- Former gymnasium

- Location within Ukraine Kirovohrad Oblast Location within Ukraine
- Coordinates: 48°48′50″N 31°39′01″E
- Country: Ukraine
- Oblast: Kirovohrad Oblast
- Massacre of the population: August 1941

Population (1926)
  - Total: 6,300 (Note: Down from 9,600 in 1860)

Zlatopil (Ukrainian: Златопіль) was a small city in Ukraine, located about 67 km northwest of Kropyvnytskyi.

== History ==
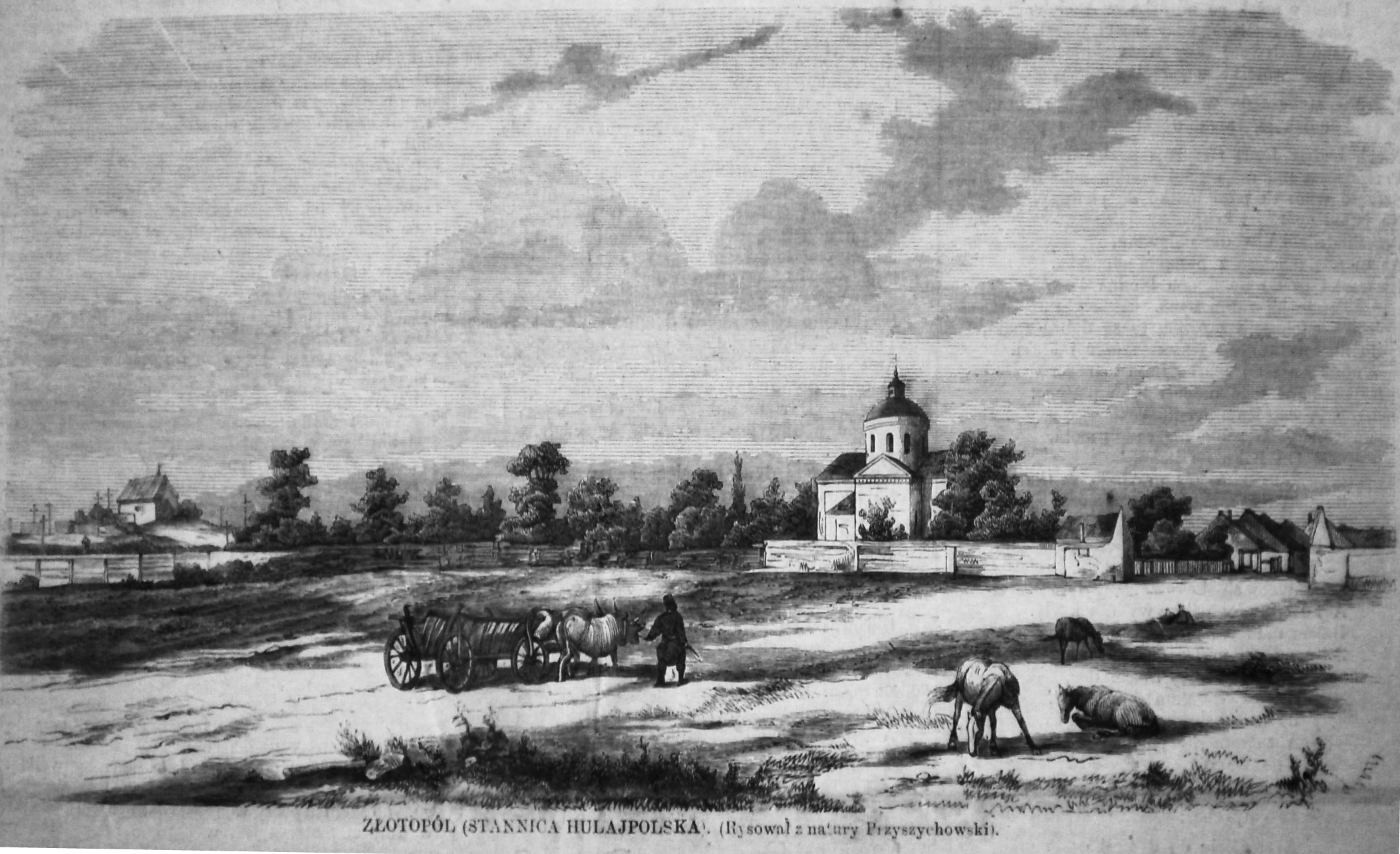
Panorama from the mid-19th century

The name of this village before 1787 was Hulajpol. During the partitions of Poland many residents of the town resettled near the Sea of Azov establishing another town of Huliaipole. In the 19th century Zlatopol was the center of Zlatopol volost, Chigirinsky Uyezd, Kiev Governorate. During the Ukrainian War of Independence, from 1917 to 1920, it passed between various factions. Afterwards it was administratively part of the Kremenchuk Governorate of Ukraine, and after its dissolution of the Kyiv Governorate of Ukraine. In 1923–1959 Zlatopil was an administrative center of Zlatopil Raion. Since 1959 it is part of Novomyrhorod city.

Before the Holocaust, Zlatopil was a prosperous Jewish shtetl. There was also a gymnasium (school) for rich people in Zlatopil. Some Jews of Zlatopil served in the Russian army during World War I and suffered under the pogroms of 1918–1920. Those who remained in Zlatopil were killed in August 1941. After World War II the Jews who survived in the Red Army returned to Zlatopil and buried the Jews of Zlatopil in a common grave in the old Jewish cemetery of Zlatopil. Today there are almost no Jews in Zlatopil.

Some of the most famous Jewish families of Zlatopil are: Brody, Rabbi Nachman of Breslov, rabbis Elijah and Hillel Poisic, (the composer) Pokrass, and Zola.

== Notable people ==
- Anna Bilińska (1857–1893) Polish painter
- Lazar Brodsky (1848–1904) Imperial Russian businessman of Jewish origin, sugar magnate
- Władysław Godik (1882–1952) Polish-Jewish singer and director
- Alexander Myshlayevsky (1856–1920) Imperial Russian general
- Hillel Poisic (1881–1953) Imperial Russian rabbi
- Milly Witkop (1877–1955) Imperial Russian anarcho-syndicalist of Jewish origin, feminist writer and activist
- Rabbi Nachman of Breslov (1772-1810) Hassidic leader

== Gallery ==
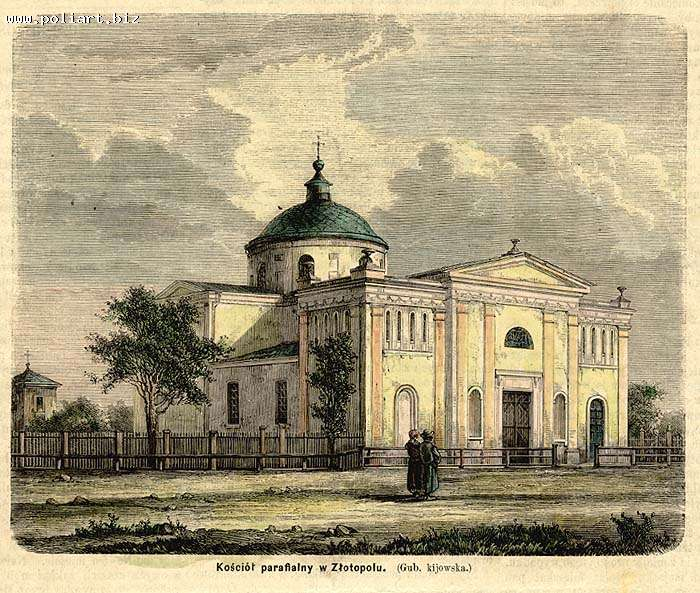
Parish church

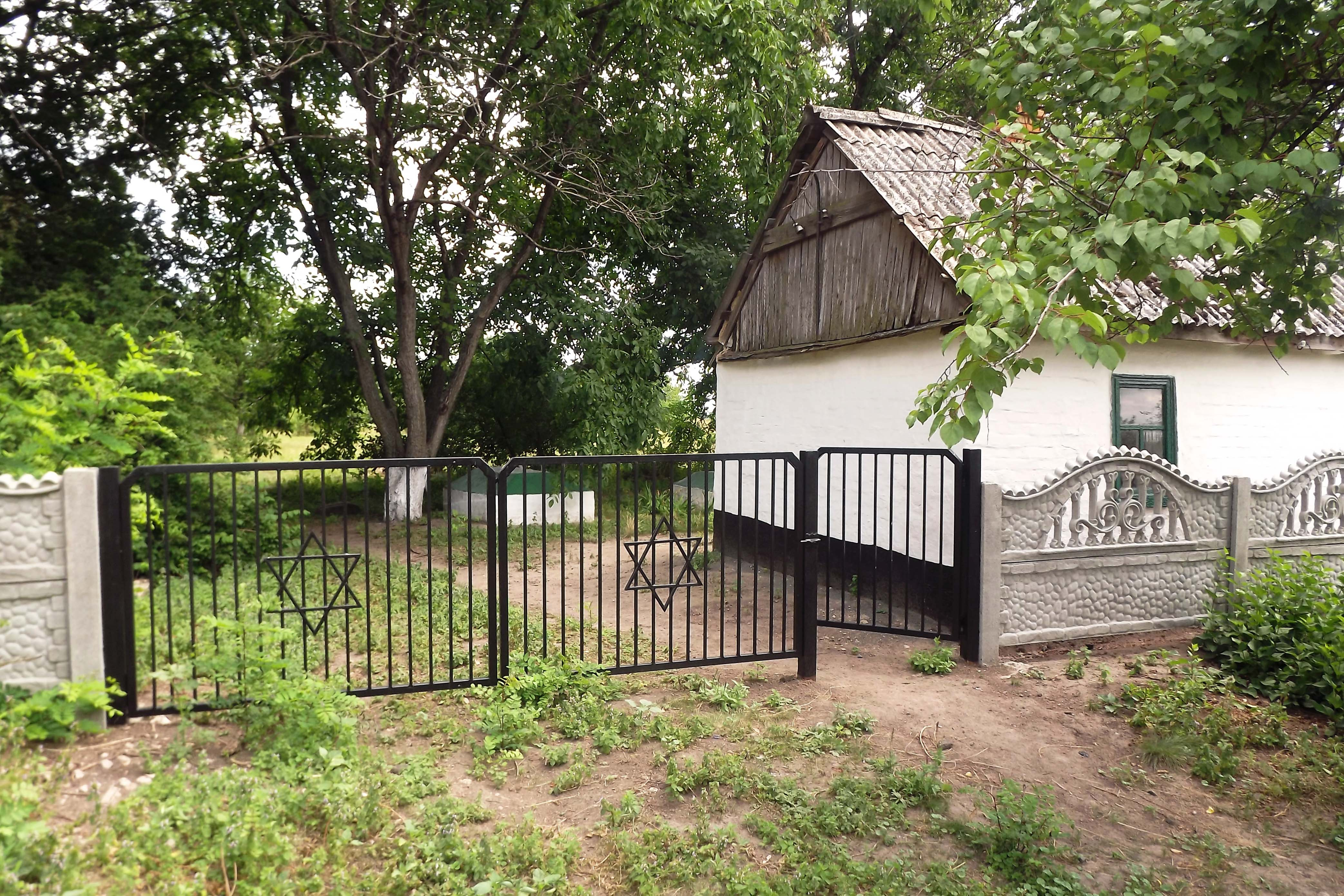
Entrance to Jewish cemetery in 2012
