= Akabia ben Mahalalel =

Akabia ben Mahalalel (Hebrew: עקביא בן מהללאל), was a Jewish religious teacher, probably of the second tannaitic generation (1st and 2nd centuries).

== Biography ==
Of his early history nothing is known; there are no references to his teachers and comparatively few of his sayings have been preserved. The Mishnah portrays him as a man who fearlessly and persistently maintained opinions on some halakhot, even in cases where different traditions were held by the majority of his colleagues, because those opinions were founded on traditions he had received from his predecessors. On one occasion the majority demanded that he renounce his divergent opinions, but he refused. It was even intimated to him that in the event of his compliance he would be elevated to the position of Av Beit Din (president of the court), but Akabia rejected the proposition, remarking, "I would rather be called a fool all my lifetime than be a sinner for one moment." His traditional burial location is in Kfar Manda in the Lower Galilee.

In the course of the discussion of the halakhah concerning the administration of "the water of jealousy" (Num. 5:11–31), Akabia declared that, if the subject of the test was not a free-born Jewess, the test-water was not to be administered; while the majority declared a proselyte or an emancipated slave to be the equal of a free-born daughter in Israel. In support of their view, the majority cited a case in point, where the former associate presidents of the Sanhedrin, Shemaiah and Abtalion, had the test made on a freed woman; whereupon Akabia disdainfully exclaimed, Dugma hishḳuha. This might mean "To one like themselves they gave to drink," and may be construed as an allusion to an old rumor to the effect that these associate presidents were themselves lineal descendants of proselytes; or it might mean "They gave her a sham to drink." The memory of those chiefs being held in esteem, Akabia's insinuation gave offense; wherefore the sentence of nidduy (isolation, excommunication) was passed on him. This he bore to the end of his days rather than violate his convictions. However, before his death, he admonished his son to submit to the views of the majority, even in the cases where he himself had shown such persistent opposition. His son expressing surprise at so apparent an inconsistency, the dying sage replied: "I have received my tradition from a majority of a school in my days, and so have my opponents. I was bound to conform to the tradition I had received; and so are they bound by their tradition. But thou hast heard the traditions both from myself and from my opponents; from a minority and from a majority, and it is proper for thee to reject the opinions of the individual and adopt the views of the majority".

Another characteristic trait of Akabia was the great stress he laid on personal merit. When, on his deathbed, he was requested by his son to recommend him to the sages, he declined to do so. His son inquired whether his father had discovered in him any trait which rendered him unworthy of such recommendation; and Akabia's reply was, "No! but your own deeds will make you welcome, or your own deeds will make you obnoxious".

As to Akabia's epoch scholars are divided. While some place him in the patriarchate of Hillel I (30 BC to 10 of the present era), and even somewhat earlier, others bring him down to the first tannaitic generation (10-80); still others believe that he flourished during the patriarchate of Gamaliel II (80-117). The circumstances and scholastic achievements of the second tannaitic generation render Akabia's excommunication more reasonable.

The decree of excommunication failed to obscure Akabia's merited fame; for his name reached subsequent generations surrounded by such a halo of glory as to throw doubt on the decree itself. "God forbid," exclaims Judah b. Ilai (139-165), "that we should think that Akabia was excommunicated, for the Temple gates were never closed behind a man in Israel so great in wisdom and in the fear of sin as was Akabia ben Mahalalel". This expression, which is based on the law forbidding an excommunicated person to enter the Temple court, was in later days taken literally, and gave rise to forced halakhic discussions and comments, as well as to hypothetical speculations about the age of Akabia. Elsewhere it is said, "Whoever asserts that Akabia was ever excommunicated will have to answer before the tribunal of heaven." This observation is wrongly attributed to Judah b. Betera I, and conclusions as to Akabia's early age are erroneously deduced from this attribution.

== Teachings ==
- Reflect upon three things and you will not fall into transgression: Know from where you came, to where you go; and before whom you are destined to give an account and reckoning. 'From where you came' – from a fetid drop; 'to where you go' – to a place of worms and maggots; 'and before whom you are destined to give an account and reckoning' – before the King of all kings, the Holy One, blessed be He!

Beyond this maxim and the halakhot enumerated above, nothing from him has been transmitted.
