= Hillel Poisic =

Torah scholar and communal worker

- הלל פוסק

Personal life
- Born: 15 January 1881 Zlatopol, Kherson Governorate, Russian Empire
- Died: 1953 (aged 71–72) Tel Aviv, Israel
- Spouse: Gitel (Tovah) Shapira
- Parents: Rabbi Elijah Poisic (father); Matalia Sonik (mother)
- Known for: Expert in releasing agunot, publishing the magazine Ha-Possek
- Occupation: Rabbi, Torah scholar, communal worker

Religious life
- Religion: Judaism

Rabbi Hillel Poisic (Hebrew: הלל פוסק; 15.1.1881 Zlatopol, Kherson Governorate, Russian Empire – 1953 Tel Aviv, Israel) was a communal worker and Torah scholar. He was an expert in releasing agunot from their husbands, who abandoned them without divorce.

The Poisic (also Poisik, Posek, Possek) family is a rabbinical family originated in the Shapira family and connected to it in marriage relationships. The Poisic members were active in Ukraine.

Rabbi Hillel Poisic's father, Rabbi Elijah Poisic (1859-1932), was one of the most important Rabbis in Ukraine. He served as rabbi in Mohlika and in Zlatopol and composed Responsa and halakhic books about Sukkot, Maimonides and the letter of divorce (get). His expertise was in circumcision law. His mother, Matalia, daughter of Zwi Sonik, was the granddaughter of Rabbi Chaim Chaikel Shapira from Kalininblatt (in Kiev district), father of Rabbi Judah Josef Loeb Shapira, president of the rabbinical court in Rakhmistrivka, and R. Israel Volodarsky, president of court in Petrikovka (in Kherson district). Rabbi Hillel studied Torah with his father and grandfather, Rabbi Moshe Zvi Poisic. He received his ordination as rabbi by the most important rabbis in south Russia, Rabbi Moshe Nathan Rubinstein from Vinnitsa and the Rabbi Yosef Halperin, president of the court of the Jewish community in Odessa.

== Biography ==
In 1898 Rabbi Hillel Poisic was married to Gitel (Tovah), the daughter of his uncle R. Selig Shapira. From 1899 to 1921 R. Hillel served as rabbi in Zlatopol and was elected by both the Jewish community and the Ukrainian authorities as a religious rabbi and a formal rabbi. When the pogroms began in Ukraine (in 1920) and the different gangs of robbers oppressed him much and threw him to the jail for several times, he decided to move to Romania. In 1921 he escaped together with his family from the revolt, pogroms and religions suppression in Russia. He went through many tribulations of travel till he arrived in 1921 to Bessarabia, which belonged to Romania that time. He served one year as rabbi in Markulshty and later on in Tatarbunary, Bessarabia (Akkerman district, Romania-Bessarabia). He was received there as a "Romanian citizen" and as a formal rabbi. He was also a Jewish religions teacher in the governmental high schools. There he began again to be engaged in communal work; he founded charity institutions and distributed the Torah amongst the poor.

During 1921-1935 he was active in favor of Zionism and served as communal worker of "Ha-Mizrachi" in Romania. In 1925 he organized a group of Jews from his community to acquire land in Bnei Brak through the company "New Palestine" from Kishinev. In 1929 and 1932 his wife visited in Israel, each time for approximately a whole year, and visited in all kinds of institutes and settlements.

In 1935, as the situation in Romania deteriorated and as the antisemitism was strengthened, Rabbi Hillel decided to immigrate to Israel, and on Passover evening 1935 he arrived to Israel together with his family and influenced successfully many other from his community to immigrate to Israel. He settled in Tel-Aviv and devoted himself to arrange his works in Torah issues and to complete parts of his works that were lost during his wanderings in Russia.

In 1938 he established an association/office in order to help to free agunot (in Hebrew, sing. agunah), namely deserted (abandoned) wives, whose husbands have disappeared without divorcing them. In 1940-1953 he edited and composed the monthly magazine Ha-Possek for Halakha and Aggadah issues, including responses in these issues. Besides he also compiled and edited the works of his father, prepared a book about civil marriage and divorce in Russia (1952) and published about Torah and Judaism issues.

== Rulings ==
One ruling of Rabbi Poisic which became well known, was his opinion against the use of flashlights for Bedikat Chametz (Hillel Omer, Orach Chaim 231). The ruling was based on the inefficiency and safety issues Rabbi Poisic saw in early flashlights, and was rejected by later posekim who quote him such as Rabbi Ovadia Yosef (Yechaveh Da'at 1:4)

== Publications ==
- Hapossek (הפוסק): scholarly monthly magazine for Halakah and Aggadah issues, since 1940
- Beit Hillel (Hillel House / בית הלל): scholarly collection, in which many rabbis took part. The book was handed to him in his 70 birthday
- Divrey Hillel (Hillel's Sayings / דברי הלל): 1926, four parts
- Naveh Hillel (Hillel's Habitation / נוה הלל): 1952, commentary on the Choshen Mishpat, the fourth part of Shulchan Aruch by Yosef Karo
- Piskey Eliyahu (Eliyahu's roles / פסקי אליהו): 2 parts, halakhic roles of his father Eliyahu Poisic
- The pamphlet Alon Bakhut (the oak of weeping / אלון בכות): 1932, a collection of articles, mourning and consolation letters on the death of his father, R. Eliyahu son of Moshe Zvi Poisic
- Etz ha-Sadeh (the Field's Tree / עץ השדה): a book of his father Eliyahu that was published in Romania in 1936 with remarks and additions of his son Hillel
- Kovetz Nidakhim (Remote Collection / קובץ נדחים): R. Hillel prepared this book for printing. The book checks halakhic problems that relate to the results of civil marriage and divorce in Russia and genealogical confusions that these anarchies form.
- R. Hillel also published about Torah and Judaism issues in Beit Vaad le-Hakhamim (= Scholars Meeting-Place), ha-Pisgah (= Climax), Jiddische Wissenschaft (= Yiddistic Science) etc.

== Bibliography ==
- "Rabbi Hillel Possek", in: David Tidhar (ed.), Who's Who in Eretz Yisrael (Hebrew: Entsiklopediyah le-halutse ha-yishuv u-bonav), 4th vol., pp. 2030–2032.
- "Possek, Hillel", in: Israel General Encyclopedia (in Hebrew), 10th vol., Israel Publish House Ltd.: Tel-Aviv, 1956, p. 3106.
- "Possek, Hillel", in: Yitzchak Rafael (ed.), Encyclopedia of the Religious Zionism (in Hebrew), 4th vol., Rabbi Kook Institute: Jerusalem, 1971, pp. 271–272.
- Russian Jewish Encyclopedia, Surnames starting with the letter P, translated by Josif and Vitaly Charny. http://www.jewishgen.org/belarus/rje_p.htm

(See under: "Poisik Eliegu" and "Poisik Gilel")

- "Rabbi Hillel Possek", in: Ha-Aretz (Daily Israeli Newspaper in Hebrew), 15.6.1953. (See also: )
- Hillel House: Jubilee Book for Rabbi Hillel Possek (in Hebrew), Jubilee Celebrations Committee: Tel-Aviv, 1951.
