= Hillel the Elder =

Jewish sage (c. 110 BCE – 10 CE)

Hillel
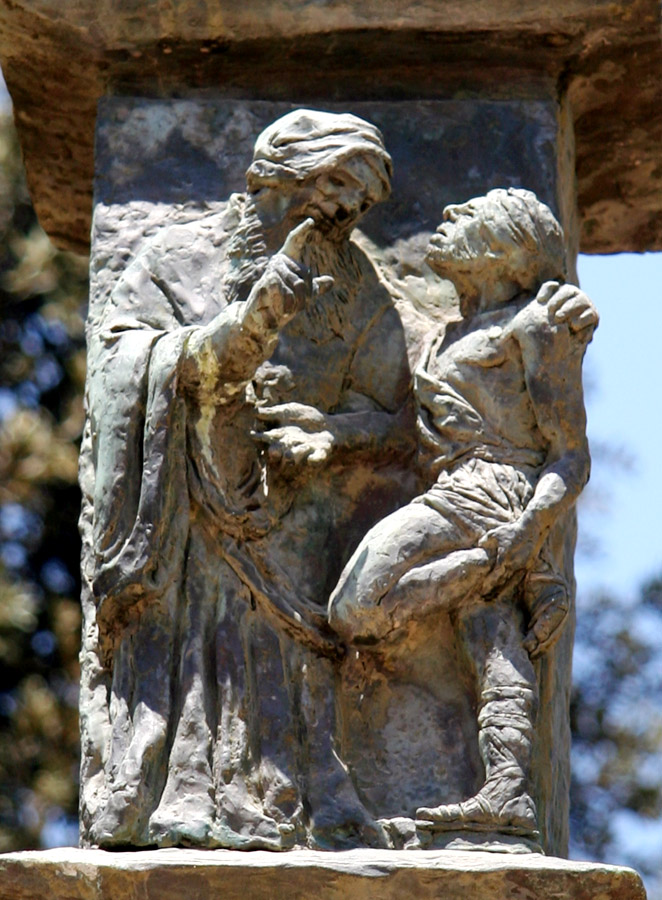
- Hillel the Elder teaching a man the meaning of the whole Torah while the man stands on one foot (detail from the Knesset Menorah, Jerusalem)

Personal life
- Born: Babylon, Parthian Empire
- Died: c. 10 CE Jerusalem, Roman Judea
- Buried: Meron, Israel
- Children: Simeon ben Hillel

Religious life
- Religion: Judaism

Hillel (Hebrew: הִלֵּל Hīllēl; variously called Hillel the Elder or Hillel the Babylonian; died c. 10 CE) was a Jewish religious leader, sage and scholar associated with the development of the Mishnah and the Talmud and the founder of the House of Hillel school of tannaim. He was active during the end of the first century BCE and the beginning of the first century CE.

Hillel is popularly known as the author of three maxims:

- "If I am not for myself, who will be for me? If I am only for myself, what am I? And if not now, when?"
- "That which is hateful to you, do not do unto your fellow. That is the whole Torah; the rest is the explanation; (Note: In MSS; in printings, "its explanation".) go and learn."
- "Be of the disciples of Aaron, loving peace and pursuing peace, loving mankind and drawing them close to the Torah."

== Biography ==
Hillel came from Babylon to Israel, although he was descended from David. His descendent Judah haNasi traced his lineage through both the female lineage of the Tribe of Benjamin and the family of David.

When Josephus speaks of Hillel's great-grandson, Rabban Shimon ben Gamliel I, as belonging to a very celebrated family, he probably refers to the glory the family owed to the activity of Hillel and Rabban Gamaliel Hazaken. Only Hillel's brother Shebna is mentioned; he was a merchant, whereas Hillel devoted himself to studying the Torah whilst also working as a woodcutter.

Hillel lived in Jerusalem during the time of King Herod and the Roman emperor Augustus. In the Midrash compilation Sifre, the periods of Hillel's life are made parallel to those in the life of Moses. At the age of forty Hillel went to the Land of Israel; forty years he spent in study; and the last third of his life he was the spiritual head of the Jewish people. A biographical sketch can be constructed that Hillel went to Jerusalem in the prime of his life and attained a great age. His 40 years of leadership likely covered the period of 30 BCE to 10 CE.

According to the Mishnah, Hillel went to Jerusalem with the intention of studying biblical exposition and tradition at the age of 40 in 70 BCE. The difficulties Hillel had to overcome to gain admittance to the school of Sh'maya and Abtalion, and the hardships he suffered while pursuing his aim, are told in the Talmud. Some time later, Hillel succeeded in settling a question concerning the sacrificial ritual in a manner that showed his superiority over the Bnei Bathyra, who were at that time the heads of the Sanhedrin. On that occasion, it is narrated, they voluntarily resigned their position as Nasi (President) in favor of Hillel. After their resignation, Hillel was recognized as the highest authority among the Pharisees (predecessors to Rabbinic Judaism). Hillel was the head of the great school, associated at first with Menahem the Essene (who might be the same Menahem the Essene as the one mentioned by Flavius Josephus in relation to King Herod), and later with Shammai (Hillel's peer in the teaching of Jewish Law).

According to the Jerusalem Talmud (Nedarim 5:6), Hillel the Elder had eighty pairs of disciples, the oldest being Jonathan ben Uzziel and the youngest Yohanan ben Zakkai.

Whatever Hillel's position, his authority was sufficient to introduce those decrees handed down in his name. The most famous of his enactments was the Prozbul, an institution that, in spite of the law concerning cancellation of debts in the Sabbatical year ensured the repayment of loans. The motive for this institution was the "repair of the world", i.e., of the social order, because this legal innovation protected both the creditor against the loss of his property, and the needy against being refused the loan of money for fear of loss. A similar tendency is found in another of Hillel's institutions, having reference to the sale of houses. These two are the only institutions handed down in Hillel's name, although the words that introduce the prozbul show that there were others. Hillel's judicial activity may be inferred from the decision by which he confirmed the legitimacy of some Alexandrians whose origin was disputed, by interpreting the marriage document (ketubah) of their mother in her favor. No other official acts are mentioned in the sources.

According to the Midrash Hillel lived to be 120 years old, like Moses, Yohanan ben Zakkai, and Rabbi Akiva.

== Notable sayings ==
Several of Hillel's teachings are explained by comparison to what Shammai (Hillel's principal adversary, rival or disputant) taught on the same subject.

Some of Hillel the Elder's teachings remain commonly known. However, at least two other notable Hillels came after him, and some scholars have suggested that some sayings attributed to "Hillel" may have originated from them.

The saying of Hillel that introduces the collection of his maxims in the Mishnaic treatise Pirkei Avot mentions Aaron HaKohen (the high priest) as the great model to be imitated in his love of peace, in his love for his fellow man, and in his leading mankind to a knowledge of the Law (Pirkei Avoth 1:12). In mentioning these characteristics, which the aggadah attributes to Moses' brother, Hillel stated his own prominent virtues. He considered "love of his fellow man" the kernel of Jewish teaching.

=== The Oral Law ===
A gentile came to Shammai and asked how many Torahs there were. Shammai answered "two": the written Torah and the Oral Torah. The gentile did not believe him and asked to be converted on condition he only had to learn the written Torah. Shammai sent him away. The gentile went to Hillel who converted him and then started teaching him the Torah(s). He started with teaching him the Hebrew alphabet: the first letter is "Aleph", the next letter is "bet", etc. The next day, Hillel taught him: the first letter is "Tav", the next letter is "shin", etc. (the alphabet backwards). The convert said that this was different to what he had been taught the previous day. Hillel replied that in the same way you need an oral teaching to learn the written alphabet, so you need an oral explanation to understand the written Torah.

=== The Golden Rule ===
The comparative response to the challenge of a prospective convert who asked that the Torah be explained to him while he stood on one foot, illustrates the character differences between Shammai and Hillel. Shammai dismissed the man. Hillel gently chided the man:

"What is hateful to you, do not do to your fellow: this is the whole Torah; the rest is the explanation; go and learn."

This rule is commonly called the Golden Rule, which has been preached to this day by a wide range of peoples, including through Confucianism, Christianity, the Enlightenment Age, and Kant's categorical imperative.

=== Love of peace ===
The exhortation to love peace emanated from Hillel's most characteristic traits—his proverbial meekness and mildness—as in the saying:

"Let a man be always humble and patient like Hillel, and not passionate like Shammai."

Hillel's gentleness and patience are illustrated in an anecdote that describes how two men made a bet on the question of whether Hillel could be made angry. Although they questioned him and made insulting allusions to his Babylonian origin, they were unsuccessful.

=== Obligations to self and others ===
From the doctrine of man's likeness to God, Hillel deduced man's duty to care for his own body. According to Midrash Leviticus rabbah he said "As in a theater and circus the statues of the king must be kept clean by him to whom they have been entrusted, so the bathing of the body is a duty of man, who was created in the image of the almighty King of the world." In this work, Hillel calls his soul a guest upon earth, toward which he must fulfill the duties of charity.

In Avot, Hillel stated "If I am not for myself, who is for me? If I am only for myself, what am I? And if not now, when?" The third part contains the admonition to postpone no duty, the same admonition he gave with reference to study: "Say not, 'When I have free time I shall study'; for you may perhaps never have any free time."

The precept that one should not separate oneself from the community, Hillel paraphrases (referencing Ecclesiastes 3:4) in the following saying: "Appear neither naked nor clothed, neither sitting nor standing, neither laughing nor weeping." Man should not appear different from others in his outward deportment; he should always regard himself as a part of the whole, thereby showing that love of man Hillel taught. The feeling of love for one's neighbor shows itself also in his exhortation (Avot 2:4).

How far his love of man went may be seen from an example that shows that benevolence must be given with regard to the needs of the poor. Thus, Hillel provided a riding horse to a man of good family who became poor, in order that he not be deprived of his customary physical exercise; he also gave him a slave, that he might be served.

=== Other maxims ===
- "Do not separate yourself from the community; do not believe in yourself until the day you die; do not judge your fellow until you have reached their place; do not say something inappropriate, for it will then be appropriated; and do not say, 'When I am free I will study,' for perhaps you will not become free."
- "Whosoever destroys one soul, it is as though he had destroyed an entire world. And whosoever saves a life, it is as though he had saved an entire world."
- "A name gained is a name lost."
- "Where there are no men, strive to be a man!"
- "My humiliation is my exaltation; my exaltation is my humiliation."

=== The study of Torah ===
The many anecdotes according to which Hillel made proselytes, correspond to the third part of his maxim: "Bring men to the Law." A later source (Avot of Rabbi Nathan) gives the following explanation of the teaching: Hillel stood in the gate of Jerusalem one day and saw the people on their way to work. "How much," he asked, "will you earn to-day?" One said: "A denarius"; the second: "Two denarii." "What will you do with the money?" he inquired. "We will provide for the necessities of life." Then said he to them: "Would you not rather come and make the Torah your possession, that you may possess both this and the future world?"

This narrative has the same points as the epigrammatic group of Hillel's sayings (Avot 2:7) commencing: "The more flesh, the more worms," and closing with the words: "Whoever has acquired the words of the Law has acquired the life of the world to come." In an Aramaic saying Hillel sounds a warning against neglect of study or its abuse for selfish purposes: "Whoever would make a name (i.e. glory) loses the name; he who increases not [his knowledge] decreases; whoever learns not [in Avot of Rabbi Nathan 12: "who does not serve the wise and learn"] is worthy of death; whoever exploits for his own use the crown (of Torah) perishes" (Avot 1:13).

== Halachic teachings ==
Only a few halachic decisions have been handed down under Hillel's name; but much of the oldest anonymous traditional literature is attributed directly to him or to the teachings of his masters. The fixation of the hermeneutical norms for Midrash and halakhic scripture exposition was first made by Hillel, in the "seven rules of Hillel," which, as is told in one source, he applied on the day on which he overcame the Bnei Bathyra. On these seven rules rest the thirteen of R. Ishmael; they were epoch-making for the systematic development of the ancient Scripture exposition.

=== Hillel's influence: "House of Hillel" vs. "House of Shammai" ===
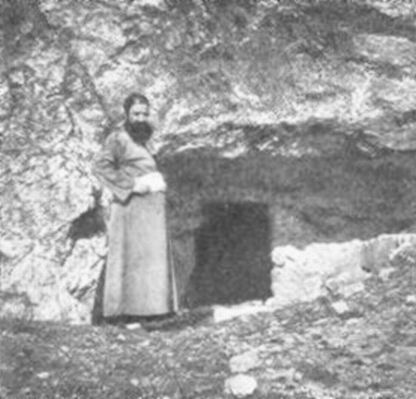
Hillel's tomb, circa 1900

Hillel's disciples are generally called the "House of Hillel", in contrast to Shammai's disciples, the "House of Shammai". Their controversies concern all branches of the Jewish law.

=== Hillel's sandwich ===
During the Passover Seder (the annual commemoration of the Exodus from Egypt), one re-enacts ancient customs in the Haggadah. In the section of Korech, or 'sandwich', participants are instructed to place bitter herbs between two pieces of matzo and eat them after saying in Hebrew: This is a remembrance of Hillel in Temple times—This is what Hillel did when the Temple existed: He enwrapped the Paschal lamb, the matzo and the bitter herbs to eat them as one, in fulfillment of the verse, "with matzot and maror they shall eat it."(Numbers 9:11). This sandwich apparently refers to traditional soft matzot rather than modern crisp matzot, and so would have borne a striking resemblance to a modern shawarma.

In modern times, when there is no paschal lamb, the Babylonian Talmud requires the practice of emulating Hillel's example by making a sandwich of matzo and maror (the "bitter herbs": either lettuce, endive, or horseradish). The maror, if lettuce or endive, is dipped in the meal's traditional charoset (a finely chopped sweet mixture of fruits and nuts; among Ashkenazi Jews it is typically made of apples, walnuts, red wine, cinnamon, and honey) just before the sandwich is made. In Ashkenazi families where grated horseradish is used for the maror instead of lettuce or endive, the maror cannot be dipped in the charoset, so it is the custom to spread the bottom piece of matzah with horseradish maror, cover it with a pile of charoset, and top it with another piece of matzah to make a hot-sweet sandwich.

== In contemporary culture ==
Hillel's reputation is such that his influence extends beyond Judaism and has entered into popular culture.

- Beginning in the late 1940s, soap-maker Emanuel Bronner (February 1, 1908 – March 7, 1997), a German-Jewish immigrant to the United States, featured the maxims of Hillel on millions of product labels. He referred to these as "Rabbi Hillel's Moral ABC." The label texts were later collected into a self-published book titled The Moral ABC I & II by Dr. Emmanuel Bronner. On page 23, Bronner wrote, "Rabbi Hillel taught Jesus to unite the whole human race in our Eternal Father's great, All-One-God-Faith." On page 39, he stated that "Small minds discuss people. Average minds discuss events. Great minds teach Rabbi Hillel's Moral ABC." These references to Rabbi Hillel remain in print in the book and on the million more soap labels manufactured since Dr. Bronner's death.
- In 1951's The Living Christ Series, Nicodemus argues with other rabbis, including Caiaphas about the School of Hillel and the School of Shammai. Caiaphas agrees with Shammai's more orthodox and rigid interpretation of the Torah, while Nicodemus agrees more with Hillel's more flexible and empathetic interpretation.
- Primo Levi's 1982 novel about Jewish partisans in World War II, If Not Now, When? (novel).
- In The Chosen Image: Television's Portrayal of Jewish Themes and Characters by Jonathan Pearl and Judith Pearl (MacFarland, 2005), the authors mention "episodes of [the 1960s series] 'Have Gun – Will Travel' [in which] Paladin, the program's erudite gunslinger [...] employs an adage from the sage Hillel"—and they continue by noting that "Rabbi Hillel's popularity as disseminator of wisdom extended to a 1973 episode of 'Medical Center,' where series star Dr. Gannon appears to be an admirer of him as well"
- In a National Public Radio transcript of a broadcast called "Modern Lessons From Hillel," which originally aired on the news show All Things Considered with co-hosts Melissa Block and Robert Siegel on September 7, 2010, Siegel said: "Well, I mentioned something that a great Jewish sage, Rabbi Hillel, said not long before the time of Jesus. A man asked Rabbi Hillel to teach him the entire Torah, the five books of Moses, while standing on one foot. ..."
- In The Jewish Story Finder: A Guide to 668 Tales Listing Subjects and Sources by Sharon Barcan Elswit (McFarland, 2012), the famous story of the man who stands on one foot is told, including this passage, "The man then goes to the great Rabbi Hillel. He tells Hillel that he does not have much time. ... Rabbi Hillel replies ..."
- In "Do Justly, Love Mercy, and Walk Humbly with God," Dale Gunnar Renlund of the Quorum of the Twelve Apostles of The Church of Jesus Christ of Latter-day Saints, spoke about Hillel the Elder to a worldwide audience in a live broadcast of General Conference in October 2020: "The importance of not mistreating others is highlighted in an anecdote about Hillel the Elder, a Jewish scholar who lived in the first century before Christ. One of Hillel's students was exasperated by the complexity of the Torah—the five books of Moses with their 613 commandments and associated rabbinic writings. The student challenged Hillel to explain the Torah using only the time that Hillel could stand on one foot. Hillel may not have had great balance but accepted the challenge. He quoted from Leviticus, saying, "Thou shalt not avenge, nor bear any grudge against the children of thy people, but thou shalt love thy neighbour as thyself." Hillel then concluded: "That which is hateful unto you, do not do to your neighbor. This is the whole of the Torah; the rest is commentary. Go forth and study."
- In Episode 5 of the Christian television drama The Chosen, Hillel's phrase "If not now, when?" is a key line exchanged between Jesus and Mary. In the second season, Pharisees Yanni and Shmuel discuss the politics of the Sanhedrin, which they see as dividable into two schools of thought: Shammai and Hillel.
- Hillel's maxim "If not now, when?" features prominently in the 2018 film Robin Hood. It is repeated several times throughout the film and appears on a title card afterwards (without citation).

== See also ==
- Pharisees
- Prozbul
- Simeon ben Hillel

== Sources ==
- Hertz, J. H. (1936). The Pentateuch and Haftoras. Deuteronomy. London: Oxford University Press.

Preceded by Sh'maya	Nasi c. 30 BCE – 10 CE	Succeeded by Shimon ben Hillel
