= Pokrass =

Pokrass (Russian: Покрасс) is a common Ashkenazi Jewish surname.

- Pokrass brothers, composing team
  - Dmitry Pokrass (1899–1978), Soviet composer
  - Samuel Pokrass (1897–1939), Soviet-American composer
- Sian Barbara Allen (b. 1946), American actress (born Barbara Susan Pokrass)
