= Hillel Roman =

Israeli visual artist

- הלל רומן
- Education: Beit Berl College; Tel Aviv University (B.A., Poetics and Comparative Literature, magna cum laude); Goldsmiths College, University of London (MFA)
- Occupation: Visual artist
- Known for: Drawing; Painting; Sculpting; Etching; Conceptual art; Astronomical observatories

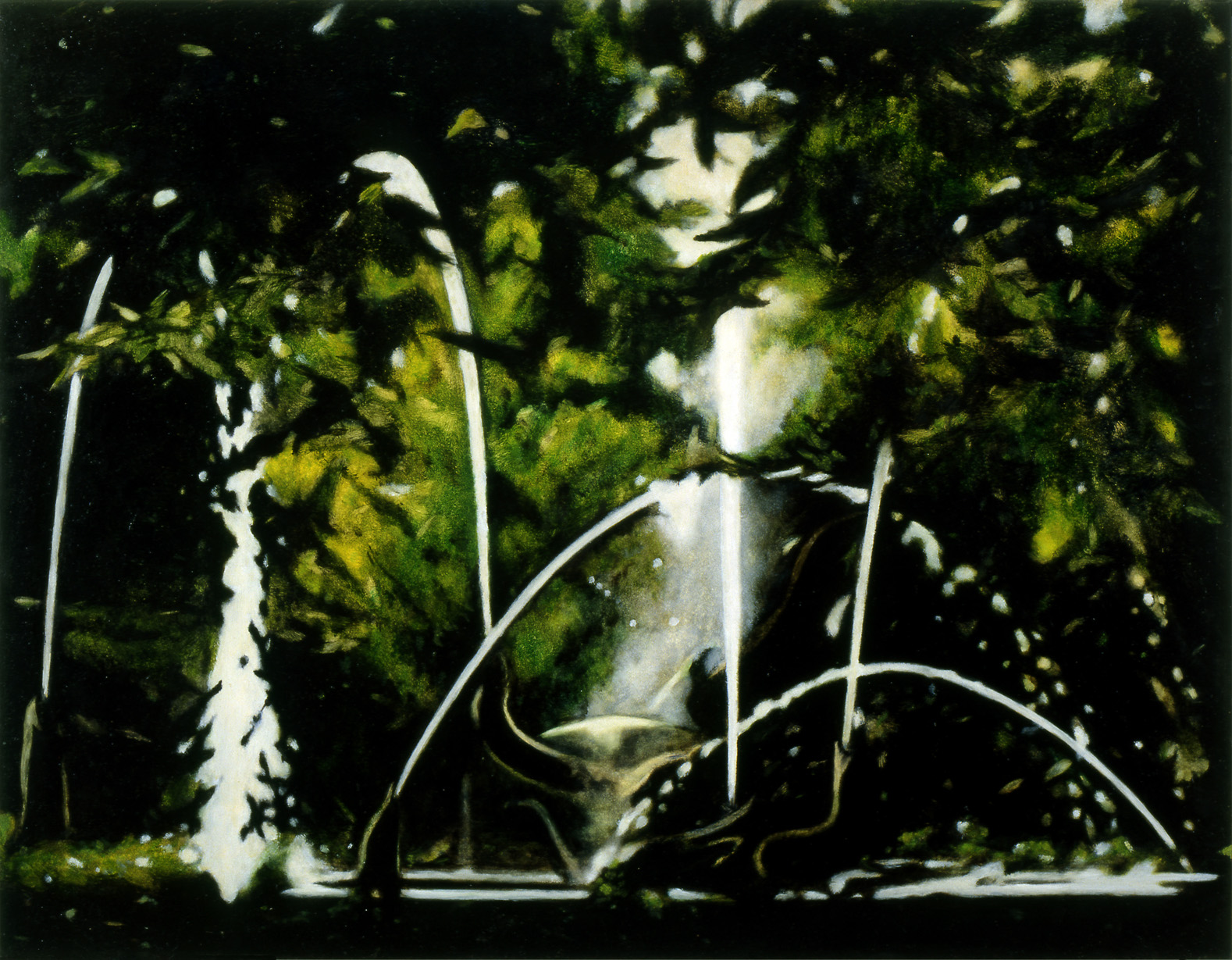
Untitled by Hillel Roman, 2005 Permanent collection, Tel Aviv Museum

Hillel Roman (Hebrew: הלל רומן) is a visual artist living and working in Tel Aviv, Israel.

== Biography ==
Roman was born in Los Angeles and now resides and works in Tel Aviv. He holds degrees in literature from Tel Aviv University and an MFA in visual arts from Goldsmiths College, London. He is a senior lecturer at Hamidrasha Art School, where he also studied.

== Work ==
Known for large charcoal drawings and public installations, Roman's work uses charcoal to depict the way in which history forms the present as a form image making and story telling. His art explores themes such as utopia, history, and the boundaries between art, life, science, and technology.

His public art often involves interaction, including High House, a treetop platform in Tel Aviv, Observatory, a public stargazing project with a hand-built telescope, and Welcome Home, an exhibition featuring war-related drawings and an interactive group musical instrument. A recent work, Crossing/Drifting, is a sculptural and performative piece involving a canoe used for community dialogue.

In an interview with curator Orit Bulgaro in the catalog of Idiolect, an exhibition at the Bat Yam Museum of Contemporary Art in 2009, Roman discussed "...the significance of the concrete versus the metaphorical, the human desire to get through the metaphor and to touch, the vain struggle to bridge the distance between the eye and the hand. Maybe that is the privilege of the painter/sculptor, and the source of his relevance, despite it all. In any case, I try to create objects or paintings that exist in that chasm between the concrete and the metaphorical; perhaps that is my way of trying to avoid filling any role."
