= Bnei Bathyra =

First-century BCE Jewish leaders

Bnei Bathyra (Hebrew: בני בתירא, lit. "The Sons of Bathyra"; Also referred to in the Jerusalem Talmud as זקני בתירא, lit. "The Elders of Bathyra") were a family of Jewish sages who were religious leaders around the period of the Destruction of the Second Temple. This family is known for its many important Jewish Sages over the course of several generations. Some tannaim are considered to belong to this family; the best known of these is Judah ben Bathyra, who resided in Nusaybin west to Babylon.

According to Heinrich Graetz, the family is named after the city Batira (בטירא), near Mount Hermon, which was settled by Herod and gave its name to the settlers. However, others disagree with this assessment, as the story involving the family and Hillel the Elder (in which the family is already established as leaders in Jerusalem) takes place near the beginning of Herod's reign, leading to a chronological difficulty.

According to the Talmud, in about 30 BCE they served as leaders of the Sanhedrin. However, they were unable to remember the law regarding whether the Passover sacrifice is offered when the 14th of Nisan falls out on Shabbat. Hillel the Elder was able to answer the question for them, and as a result they were demoted from their position and Hillel took their place. As two brothers were not allowed to serve on the Sanhedrin at the same time, this suggests that the phrase "Sons of Bathyra" was not a patronymic, but a family name (nomen gentilicium).

About 100 years later, the sons of Bathyra are recorded disputing with Johanan ben Zakkai whether the shofar should be blown when Rosh Hashana falls on Shabbat. Since this takes place about 100 years after the story involving Hillel, the sons of Bathyra mentioned here must have been descendants of the earlier leaders of the Sanhedrin, who probably still retained some of their ancestors' reputation.

== See also ==
- Judah ben Bathyra
