= Abrahamic world =

Religion-based regional classification

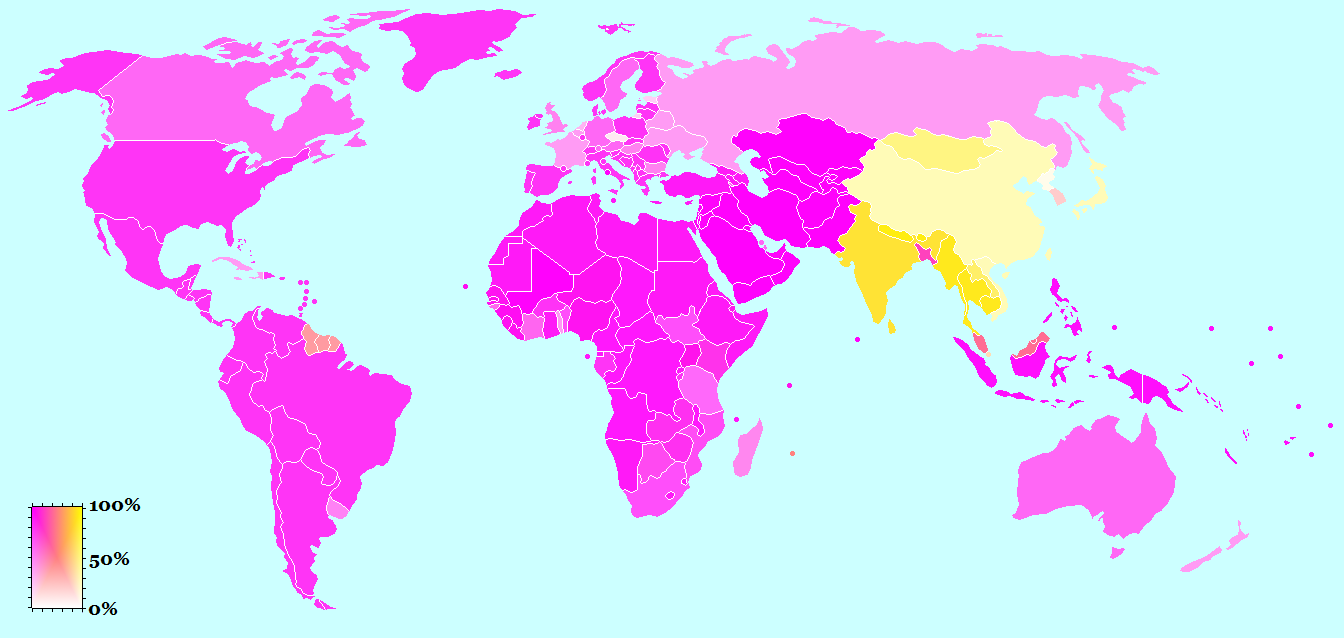
A map showing in purple the percentage of people that follow Abrahamic religions in different parts of the world. (Followers of Eastern religions are shown in yellow.)

The term Abrahamic world refers to the parts of the world where the majority of people follow the Abrahamic religions. It began in the Middle East, within which Jerusalem is considered a central Abrahamic location due to its religious importance in Christianity, Islam and Judaism.

== History ==
=== Ancient era ===
The Abrahamization of various parts of the world has been variously accompanied by the spread of Semitic cultures; in the case of Islam, the Arabic language has often accompanied its spread, while in the case of the spread of Christianity, it is argued that Europe received less influence from Semitic cultures than other parts of the Abrahamic world due in part to the influence of Paul the Apostle.

Idol worship and even non-religious figurines came to feature much less significantly throughout the newly Abrahamized regions.

=== Modern era ===
The rise of secularism in the modern Abrahamic world has been perceived as threatening to the dominance of these religions by some Abrahamic adherents.

== Region ==
The Abrahamic world consists mainly of two subregions, the Christian world (Christendom) and the Islamic world (Ummah).

== See also ==
- Indian religions
- Iranian religions
- Chinese folk religion
- Indo-Abrahamic Alliance
- Hellenistic Judaism
- Sikhism
