= Simeon ben Hillel =

1st century president of the Sanhedrin and son of Hillel the Elder

Personal life
- Children: Gamaliel
- Parent: Hillel the Elder (father)

Religious life
- Religion: Judaism

Shimon or Simeon ben Hillel was the son of Hillel the Elder. Little is known about him. Simeon was the father of Gamaliel I, and grandfather of Simeon ben Gamaliel.

Rabbinical tradition considers him Nasi of the Sanhedrin, in succession to his father.

Some Christian writers identify him with the Simeon who blessed the infant Jesus.

Preceded by Hillel the Elder	Nasi; 9 CE – ? CE	Succeeded by House of Shammai
