= Johanan HaSandlar =

Rabbi

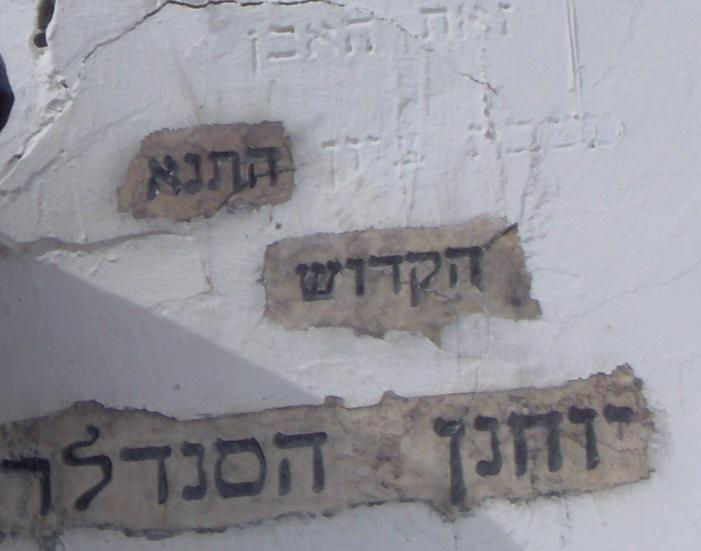
Tomb of Johanan HaSandlar, Meron, Israel

Johanan HaSandlar (Hebrew:יוחנן הסנדלר; lit. "Johanan the Shoemaker" or "Johanan the Sandalmaker", Hebrew: יוחנן הסנדלר; alternatively "Johanan the Alexandrian") was a rabbi who lived in the second century (fourth generation of tannaim).

== Biography ==
He was a great-grandson of Gamaliel, a prominent member of the Sanhedrin; he also purportedly traced his ancestry back to David. Rashi, the great medieval commentator, is disputed to be a 33rd-generation descendant of Rabbi Yochanan.

The name "HaSandlar" may imply that Yohanan earned his living as a shoemaker, but it could also indicate that he was a native of Alexandria in Roman Egypt.

He was one of the main students of Rabbi Akiva (c. 50–135) and a contemporary of Rabbi Shimon bar Yochai (mid-second century).

Once, he went with several colleagues to the Valley of Rimmon to institute a leap-year. Rabbi Meir had just cited an opinion which he ascribed to Akiba, but the authenticity of which Johanan denied, adding, "I have waited on R. Akiba standing [by his side as an advanced student] longer than you did sitting [as a mere hearer]." The learned company took umbrage at this derogatory remark, and murmured, "Johanan ha-Sandalar is a true Alexandrian [given to boasting]." The incident, however, ended in reconciliation, and the disputants did not leave the session without kissing each other. Because he is called here "a true Alexandrian," it is assumed that he was a native of Alexandria.

Once, he once exposed himself to great danger to obtain an authoritative halachic decision. During the Hadrianic persecutions, when many rabbis had been put to death for teaching Judaism, Rabbi Akiva was imprisoned and awaiting his doom at the command of Rufus. A marital question agitated the rabbis, and Johanan undertook to procure the closely guarded Akiva's advice upon it. Disguised as a peddler, he offered some goods for sale near the prison: "Who wants needles? Who wants hooks? How about private halitzah?" Akiba, looking out through an aperture, said in reply, "Do you have spindles? Do you have kasher (= "valid")?"

At one time during the persecutions, Johanan and Eleazar ben Shammua left Eretz Yisrael, intending to betake themselves to Judah ben Bathyra in Nisibis; but they did not carry out their intention. By the time they arrived at Sidon they felt too homesick to proceed any farther, and returned.

He died on the 29th day of the Hebrew month of Tammuz (the same yahrzeit as that of Rashi), and was buried 200 meters from the tomb of Shimon bar Yochai in Meron, now located in Israel.

== Teachings ==
His halachic teachings are sometimes cited in the Mishnah, and Simeon ben Gamaliel II reports two halakhot from him.

=== Quotes ===
- "Every assembly that is for the sake of Heaven will survive; but if it is not for the sake of Heaven, it will not survive."
