= Judah ben Bathyra =

Mishnah rabbi

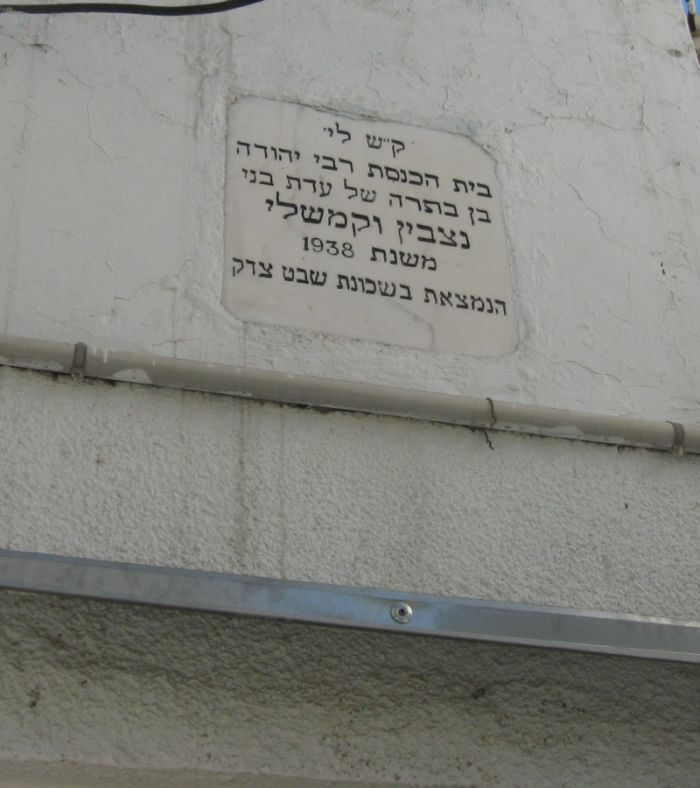
- Buried: Nusaybin

Religious life
- Religion: Judaism

Judah ben Bathyra or simply Judah Bathyra (also Beseira, Hebrew: יהודה בן בתירא) was an eminent tanna. The Mishnah quotes 17 laws by R. Judah, and the Baraita about 40; he was also a prolific aggadist. He was a member of the Bnei Bathyra family.

== Biography ==
He must have lived before the destruction of the Temple, since he prevented a pagan in Jerusalem from partaking of the Paschal offering. Thereupon he received the message: "Hail to thee, Rabbi Judah ben Bathyra! You live in Nisibis, but your net is spread in Jerusalem". Since R. Judah was not present himself at the Passover in Jerusalem, it may be concluded that he was far advanced in years, although as a citizen of a foreign land he was not bound by the law which demanded the celebration of the Passover at Jerusalem. At Nisibis in Mesopotamia he had a famous college, which is expressly recommended together with other famous schools.

=== Personal interactions ===
- R. Eleazer ben Shammua and R. Johanan the sandal-maker started on a journey to Nisibis in order to study under Judah ben Bathyra, but turned back when they reflected that they were giving preference to an alien country over Israel.
- R. Judah b. Bathyra himself undertook a journey to Rome with some colleagues. No sooner had they landed at Puteoli than they returned home weeping.
- R. Judah once arrived at Nisibis just before the beginning of the fast of the Ninth of Ab, and although he had already eaten, he was obliged to partake of a sumptuous banquet at the house of the chief of the synagogue. But, most probably, the story is about another R. Judah ben Bathyra, since R. Hiyya (maybe R. Hiyya the Great) is cited among him in the story.

== Ambiguity of identity ==
Since controversies between him and Rabbi Akiva are frequently mentioned, these being chronologically impossible, the existence of a second R. Judah b. Bathyra must be assumed, who was probably a grandson of the former, and therefore Akiva's contemporary. It is possible that there existed even a third R. Judah b. Bathyra, who was a contemporary of R. Josiah or of R. Judah I; he also seems to have lived at Nisibis.

It is evident from the cases quoted in the Tosefta that R. Judah b. Bathyra (probably the earliest one by that name) did not quite keep pace with the halakhah as it was formulated in Israel, and represented rather the earlier standpoint. This R. Judah is probably also the one who now and again is mentioned simply as "Ben Bathyra". In Mishnah, Pesachim 3:3, the editions have "R. Judah ben Bathyra," while the Yerushalmi has only "ben Bathyra." There is one passage, however, where R. Judah b. Bathyra and b. Bathyra are reported as entertaining different opinions; hence Maimonides takes "ben Bathyra" to be identical with R. Joshua ben Bathyra.

== See also ==
- Bnei Bathyra
