= Soferim (Talmud) =

Non-canonical Talmudic tractate

Masekhet Soferim (Hebrew: מסכת סופרים), the "Tractate of the Scribes", is a non-canonical Talmudic tractate dealing especially with the rules relating to the preparation of holy books, as well as with the laws of Torah reading. One of the minor tractates, it is generally thought to have originated in eighth-century Land of Israel. Being of late and uncertain date, it is now generally printed as Talmudic addenda.

== Chapters ==
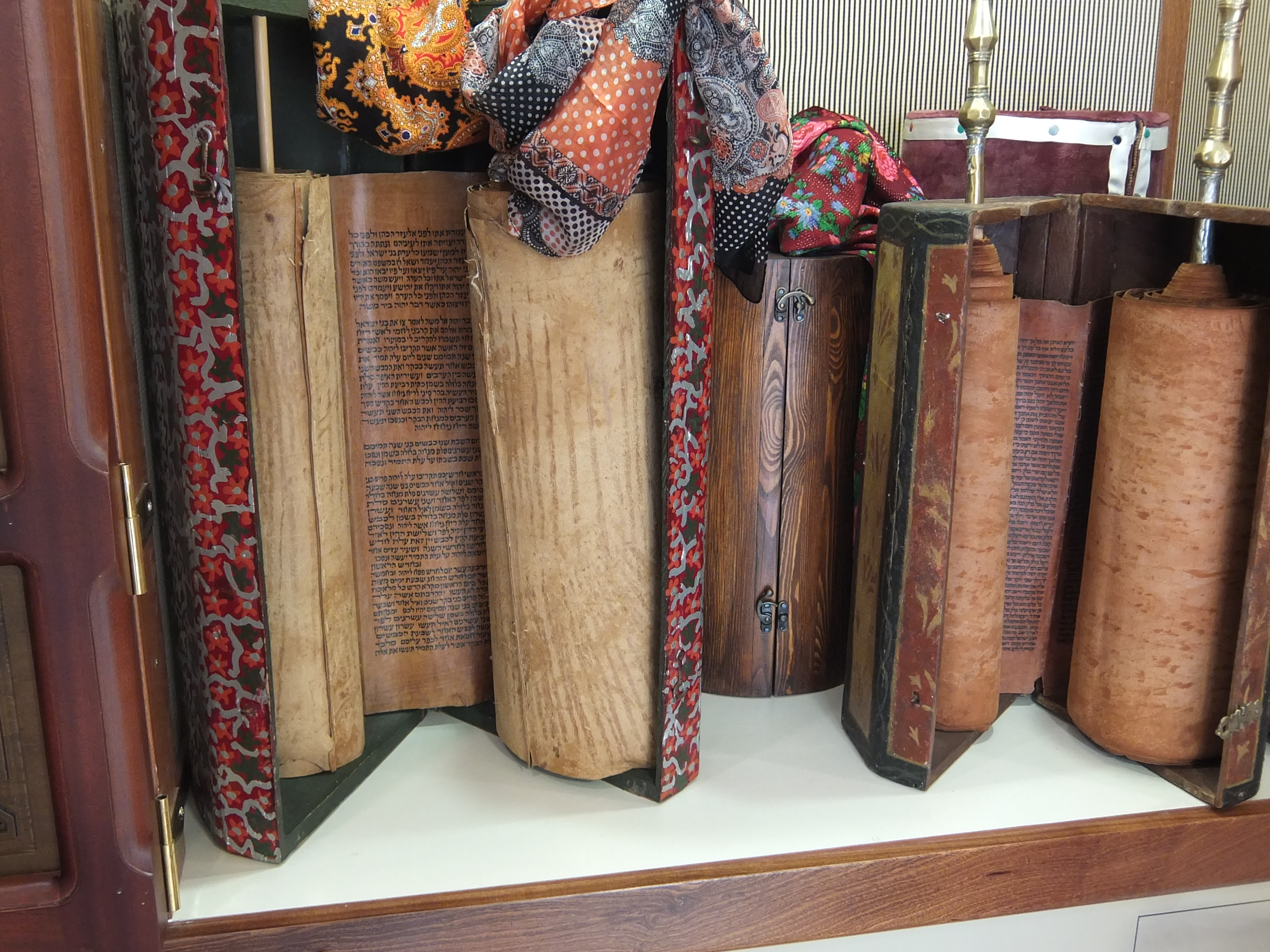
Yemenite Torah scrolls

Soferim consists of 21 chapters, containing 225 paragraphs ("halakhot") in all. The chapters may be summarized as follows:

1: On parchment and other writing-material; language, and translation of the Jewish Scriptures; the Septuagint; persons who are qualified to prepare books; leaves and pages; open and closed paragraphs.
2: Spaces between letters, words, lines, pages, and books; space-lines; number of columns to the leaf, and lines to the column; width and height of the scrolls; rollers; sewing; mending; final letters.
3: Writing several books on a single scroll; verse-marks in the scroll of the Law; superscriptions; palimpsests; procedure in regard to incorrectly written scrolls; rolling and unrolling; manner of rolling and reading; respectful handling of the scroll of the Law; careful use of food as a gift of God.
4: The names of God and the interdiction against erasing them; Masoretic enumeration of such names; the sinfulness of profanely using any of them.
5: Sacrosanct writing of the names of God; scribal errors in such and in the lines of the sacred scroll; the Divine Name on vessels and utensils; preservation of scrolls and other writings which have become useless; use of loaned writings.
6: Points written in the Torah; textual variations in the ancient scrolls used in the Temple at Jerusalem; Masoretic textual and orthographical variants.
7: Masoretic combination of the Qere and Ketiv.
8: Textual variants in Psalms 18 and II Samuel 22, and in Isaiah 36-39 and II Kings 18-20
9: Capital letters in the Torah; written words for which others must be substituted in reading; passages which are neither read nor translated.
10: General laws of Torah reading; number of readers; number of persons requisite for public religious functions; kaddish and barekhu.
11: Order of Torah reading and of the translations to be read; errors in Torah reading
12: Method of reading the curses, the songs, and the Ten Commandments; the Torah reading on the Rosh Hodesh of Hanukkah; mode of writing the songs in Exodus 15, Judges 5, and Deuteronomy 32, as well as the order of reading Deuteronomy 32.
13: Method of writing the Hagiographa in general and the scroll of Esther in particular; blessings in connection with the Mafṭir and the reading of the Torah.
14: Blessing on reading the Hagiographa in general and the scroll of Esther in particular; liturgical observances prefatory to the reading; persons authorized to read and to officiate as ḥazzanim; individuals qualified to read the scroll of Esther; reading the other smaller scrolls; sanctity of the scroll of the Law; phylactery and mezuzot.
15: Sanctity of other religious writings; diversity of the rabbinical sciences; occupations to be taught to children.
16: Value of the study of the Torah; the aggadah; manifold interpretations; scholarship of the ancient teachers; sections of the Pentateuch; chapters of the Psalms; the Kedushah prayer.
17: General laws on the sections prescribed for the festivals; assistants at the sacrifice and their prayers; lessons and psalms for Rosh Hodesh.
18: Daily and festival psalms; order of prayer for the anniversary of the destruction of Jerusalem; observances for Yom Kippur.
19: Further regulations regarding the psalms for festivals; formulas of prayer for the festivals; eulogy on announcing the new moon; benedictions for weddings and funerals.
20: Kiddush levana; lighting the Hanukkah candles; blessings and Torah reading for Hanukkah; the Kedushah prayer on holidays; "Hallel."
21: Nisan, the month of rejoicing; Purim and its observances; the blessings of the Torah and the Megillah at Purim; Haggadah of the Jewish Patriarchs.

== Divisions ==
Soferim may be divided into three main divisions: chapters 1–5, 6–9, and 10–21, the last of which is subdivided into two sections, 10-15 and 16:2-21. The tractate derives its name from its first main division (chapters 1–5), which treats of writing scrolls of the Law, thus conforming to the ancient custom of naming a work according to its initial contents.

According to Zunz, "the little work is now badly disarranged, as is shown by the confusion of the two principal themes [i.e., the preparation of scrolls, and the rituals of Torah reading and prayers], and the position and character of the aggadah." Zunz likewise shows the relationship existing between this work and later aggadot. This lack of system, however, is not the result of careless copying or other negligence, but is due to the nature of the tractate's redaction; for it is a composite of at least three works, and the systematic order of the earlier part has evidently been disarranged by interpolations. In its present form the tractate is intended more for Torah readers and hazzanim than for scribes: it is in great part confined to ritual laws, although it must be borne in mind that the same person doubtless combined the functions of scribe and reader.

=== First part ===
This first part is the earliest component of the work, and is extant also as an independent "minor tractate," entitled Massekhet Sefer Torah; in this form it is a systematic work, but as incorporated in Soferim, although its division into chapters and paragraphs has been retained, its order has been disarranged by interpolations. A comparison of the two texts shows in an instructive way how ancient Jewish works developed in the course of time. The minor tractate Sefarim, edited by Schönblum, is not earlier (as he assumes) but rather later than Masseket Sefer Torah, from which it is an extract. The name "Sefarim" (= "books") is merely the plural of "sefer," designating the Torah as "the book" par excellence.

=== Second part ===
Chapters 6 to 9 constitute a separate part, containing Masoretic rules for writing; the first four paragraphs of chapter 6 and some passages of chapter 9 are of early date. This portion was undoubtedly added by Masoretes of Tiberias; and the main portion of the modern Masorah, which also contains the passages in question, likewise originated in the same school. The first two parts of Soferim are acknowledged to be Judean, and were intended for the scribes; the last three halakhot are a kind of appendix relating to the reading of certain words and passages.

=== Third part ===
The third division is chiefly devoted to rules concerning the order of Torah reading, together with liturgical laws. It is not a uniform composition, although the first section (chapters 10–15) is concerned almost entirely with the sequence of Torah readings, while the remaining part (chapters 16–21) contains liturgical laws. The contents of 16:1 apparently form the conclusion of the portion of the work which precedes it. The third part of Soferim is likewise Judean in origin, as is shown by its sources; nor is this view contradicted by the phrases "our teachers in the West" (רבותינו שבמערב, 10:8) and "the people of the East and the people of the West" (בני מזרח ובני מערב at 10,end; 13:10), since either a Palestinian or a Babylonian might have used such expressions, although these passages may be interpolations.

The second section of the last portion (16:2-21) was added latest of all. It contains passages from the Babylonian Talmud, mentioning the "teachers of the land of Israel" (no longer מערב, as in 21:1) in 17:4, and speaking of the Nazarenes (נוצרים = Christians) in 17:6, while a passage from Pirkei De-Rabbi Eliezer is cited on the authority of R. Eliezer b. Hyrcanus (19:12). These peculiarities indicate that its date is relatively late, even though these last passages are in the main also Judean in origin, as is shown by the use of the name "Nazarene."

== Place of composition ==
Many details of the text indicate detailed knowledge of the Jerusalem Talmud and the custom of the Land of Israel, and thus point to an origin there (rather than in Babylonia):

- The customs of Jerusalem are also mentioned (18:5, 21:6) in a way which indicates an acquaintance with them and points to an author who may have been from Tiberias, but was not from Jerusalem. The names of the school, teachers, and countries also confirm this view.
- Hai Gaon knew nothing of the liturgical observance mentioned in 19:11
- The controversy regarding the mode of reading (21:7) is taken from the Jerusalem Talmud, not from the parallel passage in the Babylonian Talmud. The long passage which follows is a direct quotation from the Jerusalem Talmud.
- The Babylonian amora Rav Yosef is designated as "Rabbi," and not as "Rav" (13:7)
- The assumption that there are weekly sections which do not contain 21 verses (11:4) applies only to the triennial cycle of the Land of Israel
- Soferim 13:3-5 parallels the Jerusalem Talmud, Megillah 3:7 (74b).

The hypothesis that Soferim is based on Palestinian sources agrees with the ancient tradition (Nahmanides and others) that all the small tractates are Palestinian in origin; and modern scholars, except for I.H. Weiss, also accept this view. There were scholars in Palestine even after the final redaction of Jerusalem Talmud, and the Bible was still the chief subject of study.

== Date of composition ==
The evidence of all these facts makes it very probable that this tractate was finally redacted about the middle of the 8th century, an assumption which is supported by the statement of Rabbeinu Asher that Soferim was composed at a late date. At that period written prayer-books were doubtless in existence and were probably produced by the scribes, who combined the offices of communal chazzan and reader. It was natural, therefore, that in tractates intended for the scribes all the regulations should be collected which concerned books, the Masorah, and the liturgy. It is practically certain that few copies of the Talmud were made at that time, and those without special rules; consequently no allusions to them are found in Soferim.

The fact that no sources are given for a number of the regulations in the first part points to an early date of composition. Similarly, in the third part (chapters 10–21), which is later, no sources are assigned for a number of halakhot; so that care must be taken not to assign the compilation of this longest portion to too recent a date. Both the form and the content of those passages in which authorities are not mentioned point to a Judean origin; they may have been derived from the lost portions of Yerushalmi and various midrashic works, which, indeed, they may be regarded as in part replacing. Only certain interpolations, as well as the aggadic passage at the end of the tractate (or, in several manuscripts, at its beginning), may have been added much later. The division of the last part into sections ("perakim") seems to have been intended to secure a uniform size for the several sections; for 16:1 belongs to the end of chapter 15, and 19:1 to the end of 18, their separation being due to external reasons.

== Notable laws ==
As the substance of the tractate has been incorporated in later works on orthography, the Masorah, and the liturgy, only a few points peculiar to it need be mentioned here. In 1:13 occurs the maxim "He who cannot read is not allowed to write." Custodians seem to be mentioned in 2:12. The first notice in Jewish literature of the codex in contradistinction to the scroll occurs in 3:6, a passage which is to be translated as follows: "Only in a codex [may the Torah, the Prophets, and the Writings be combined]; in a scroll the Torah and the Prophets must be kept separate"; while the following section describes a scroll of the Law as being divided into verses (doubtless by means of blank spaces), or as having the initial portion of its verses pointed. Among the ancients the beginning ("resh pasuk") of a verse rather than the end ("sof pasuk") was emphasized, since the former was important mnemonically. There were scribes, therefore, who marked the initial of the verse, although there is no trace of such points in the present Masorah and system of accentuation.

The earliest passage referring to "dyed leather" (parchment) is 3:13, although it is possible, in view of 2:10, that originally בעורות צבאים (with deer leather) stood in place of בעורות צבועים (with dyed leather). Even if that be true, however, this is still the first reference to colored parchment for synagogal scrolls; for nothing else could be implied by these words in the received reading. The skin of game was a favorite writing-material; so that while it was forbidden to use half leather and half parchment, half leather and half skin of game were allowable. It was forbidden, moreover, to cut the edges of books (5:14). A scribal term which does not occur elsewhere is found in 5:1,2 (מעכב, variant reading מחטב). There were generally 72 lines to the column in a scroll of the Law (12:1). The passage 13:1 refers to the stichic writing of the Psalms; Book of Job, and Proverbs; and the remark "A good scribe will note" shows that the passage was written at a time when this detail was no longer generally observed.

Soferim is the first work to distinguish between the three grades of inspiration in the Bible: Torah, Neviim ("divrei kabbala"), and Ketuvim ("divrei kedushah").

== Halakhic authority ==
Because Soferim belongs to the Minor Tractates, and is not part of the Babylonian Talmud nor the Jerusalem Talmud, later generations of Jews have not always accepted its rulings (in whole or in part) as authoritative. There are a few points of halakha which rabbis have decided straight from Soferim, since they are not mentioned in the Talmud. For example, many Rishonim and the Vilna Gaon rule that a berakha must be recited before the reading of the megilloth Song of Songs, Ruth, Lamentations, and Ecclesiastes; this berakha is mentioned in Soferim, though not in the Talmud. Similarly, Rabbi S. S. Boyarski ruled that a berakha must be recited before reading the other books of Kethuvim; this berakha, too (different in text from the one for the megilloth) is mentioned only in Soferim, and not in the Talmud. However, these rulings have not been accepted by all groups of Jews and the last ruling is not accepted in any community today.

Other rulings of Masekhet Soferim have seen wider acceptance. For example, the Shulchan Aruch rules that Kiddush levana should preferably be recited at the conclusion of the Sabbath, a ruling whose earliest source is Masekhet Soferim.
