= Seder (Bible) =

A seder (plural: sedarim) is part of a biblical book in the Masoretic Text of the Hebrew Bible.

== In the Torah ==
The text of the Torah is divided into roughly 150 sedarim though sources disagree on the exact number. Differing texts record 141, 154 or 167 sedarim.

The division of the Torah into sedarim is a result of the ancient custom of a triennial cycle for Torah reading. The Babylonian Talmud states that it was the custom of Jews in Israel to read the Torah in about three-year cycle. A combination of two reading cycles of the appropriate length including leap years lasted seven years as the Shemita cycle. The division of the Torah into sederim was also accompanied by the Haftara corresponding to the division. The Haftara according to this reading cycle was preserved in fragments from the Cairo Geniza. Yosef Ofer identified the various lists of haftarot and compiled a list of all the haftarot according to the three-year custom.

Throughout the generations, this division was mentioned many times and some of the Midrash books, such as Midrash Tancuma and Deuteronomy Rabbah, are divided according to it. It is also mentioned in editions of Bible commentaries.

== In other parts of the Bible ==
The books of Nevi'im and Ketuvim are also divided into sedarim. Unlike the parashot (another subdivision of the biblical books in the Masoretic Text that is indicated by various spacing techniques), which are thematic divisions of the text, the divisions indicated by the sedarim is mostly quantitative. In Tiberian masoretic manuscripts, it is noted in the margin. In this part there are 293 sedarim, which are the numbers of weekdays during the year, some people read that 293 Sedarim in addition to the parashah and complete the whole Bible every year.

== Statistics ==
The number of verses in each seder is not fixed. On average, in the entire Bible, each seder contains about 52 verses, but the average number of verses in a seder in the Torah is about 38 verses, in the Nevi'im about 44 verses, and in the ketuvim about 66 verses. The average number of words in each seder in the Torah is about 712 words, in the Nevi'im it is 673 words and in the ketuvim it is 693 words.

The shortest seder in the Torah is seder 10 in Book of Numbers and contains 7 verses and is also the shortest seder in the entire Bible, the shortest seder in the Nevi'im is seder 31 in Book of Kings and contains 26 verses, and the shortest seders in the Ketuvim are seders 1 and 2 in the Book of Esther with 26 verses each.

The longest seder in the Torah is seder 26 in Book of Exodus and contains 82 verses, the longest seder in the Nevi'im is seder 2 in the Book of Numbers with 83 verses and the longest seder in the Ketuvim is seder 16 in Psalms and contains 167 verses and it is also the longest seder in the entire Bible.

== Modern use ==
The sedarim are seldom used in modern times. The Babylonian tradition of completing the Torah in an annual cycle became the dominant tradition, and eventually the Palestinian reading cycle ceased to be used altogether. This made the sedarim liturgically obsolete.

Additionally, the use of the chapter divisions of the Bible has made the sedarim unnecessary as structural divisions in the text.

Today few editions of the Bible mark the sedarim. The Biblia Hebraica Stuttgartensia note them in the margin, and the Koren Tanakh ascribes to them ascending Hebrew numerals.

== Other use ==
In its sense as part of cyclical public reading of a biblical book, the term is also used to designate the Weekly Torah portion. In this sense it is often called sidra (plural sidrot) from the same root.
