= Ikuv keriah =

Delaying the reading of the Torah

Ikuv keriah (Hebrew: עיכוב קריאה, lit. 'delaying the reading') was a practice of European Jews in which a person could delay the Torah reading in the synagogue until his complaint was heard by the community and its leadership. This custom allowed the synagogue to become a court. Some believe this is the reason why the Kol Nidre prayer is appropriate on the night before Yom Kippur.

== Practice ==
The complainant would stand by the Torah ark, and prevent the removal of the Torah scroll before its ceremonial reading in synagogue. By custom, no person had the right to move him from his place, until one of the community leaders promised to stand by him and take care of his complaint. The complaint could be against either the community or an individual.

A description of the practice appears in the Or Zarua (13th century):

"It once happened in Cologne that one complained on the Shabbat when the parsha "Emor el hakohanim" should have been read, and delayed the prayer and Torah reading the entire day, and when the next [Shabbat] came the rabbi R Eliezer son of R Shimon zt"l directed to begin with the parsha "Emor el hakohanim" and to read it and also [the parsha] "Behar Sinai" which should have been read that Shabbat."

A different form of protest consisted of delaying the prayer between pesukei dezimra and the Shema blessings. The protester would stand in the place designated for the prayer leader (who would normally begin reciting the communal prayer at this point), and prevent the prayer leader from beginning. The Rema indicated that this practice was customary, and regarded it as a mitzvah (commandment) which justified disrupting prayer and speaking of extraneous matters in the middle of prayer. However, if the prayer leader had already said "Barchu", "a place where it was customary to cry out about each other between Kaddish and Barchu and between "Yotzer Or", or to speak of the needs of the masses - they are in error."

The Hatam Sofer describes how the custom was practiced in his childhood. There exist testimony of ikuv keriah occurring in the year 5665 (1904-1905) in the Hurva synagogue, by women who prevented the reading from commencing. Another practical occurrence was recorded in 5721 (1960-1961) by R' Yisrael Kanievsky.

== Permitted times ==
There exists a tradition, according to which Rabbeinu Gershom decreed that the Torah reading should not be delayed on Shabbat, unless the method had already been tried unsuccessfully three times on weekdays. When the complaint was against the public, it was permitted even on Shabbat. On Hol HaMoed it was permitted to complain. There was also a discussion about complaint on the Days of Awe, particularly when the complainant was not a local resident.

In the community of Verona, it was decided to end the custom. Today, the custom no longer exists in any community.
