= Yom le-yabbashah =

Piyyut liturgical poem

"Yom le-yabbashah" (Hebrew: יום ליבשה) is a piyyut (liturgical poem) composed by Rabbi Yehuda Halevi for the seventh day of Passover, focusing mainly on the splitting of the Red Sea during the exodus from Egypt. The piyyut is recited as part of the blessings of the Shema prayer, and it is also sung in some communities at the festive meal of the Brit Milah (circumcision ceremony).

== Popularity ==
The piyyut gained widespread popularity and has various melodies and tunes. It is included in the prayer traditions of Eastern Ashkenazic communities, Ladino-speaking communities, North African communities, the Romaniote rite, and even in the Yemenite tradition. Copies of the piyyut were also found in the Cairo Geniza.

In the Eastern Ashkenazic tradition, it is also customary to also recite "Yom le-yabbashah" on Shabbat Shirah, the sabbath on which the Song of the Sea is read. Additionally, it is recited on a Shabbat during which there will be a Brit Milah ceremony.

== Type ==
According to most customs, "Yom le-yabbashah" is considered a piyyut of the "Ge'ulah" (Redemption) type, recited just before the concluding blessing of "Ga'al Yisrael" (Redeemer of Israel) in the blessings of Shema. However, there is a hypothesis that originally the piyyut was not intended as a redemption piyyut but rather belonged to the category of "Mi Kamocha," another type of piyyut said in the previous paragraph of the blessing.

Despite its initial association with themes of redemption, the piyyut has verses concluding with the phrase 'Shira Chadasha Shibchu g'eulim' (A new song they sang, praises of redemption), and it leads into the verse 'Hashem Yimloch Le'Olam Va'ed' (The Lord shall reign forever and ever). Indeed, in the Romaniote tradition, it was recited in the place.

== Contents ==
The main theme of the piyyut is praise and glorification of God for the salvation of the people of Israel during the exodus from Egypt and the splitting of the Red Sea. The latter part of the piyyut shifts to a plea for redemption, asking God to gather the Jewish people, metaphorically using the language of marriage, and emphasizing their adherence to the commandments of Brit Milah and Tzitzit. The song also references verses and narratives from Tanakh.

== Usage ==
Originally, the song was designed for the seventh day of Passover, the day commemorating the splitting of the Red Sea. This seems to be the occasion for which it was originally written. However, over time, it became part of other occasions, such as Shabbat Shirah and Brit Milah ceremonies. Rabbi Mordecai Yoffe suggested reciting it even on the eighth day of Passover without circumcision, but this custom was not accepted.

In the later period (likely in the 19th century), some Eastern Ashkenazi communities adopted the practice of singing the piyyut as a song during the festive meal of the Brit Milah, outside the context of regular prayers, even during a weekday Brit. This has become the norm in many Ashkenazic communities today.

Romaniote communities also adopted the piyyut for Shabbat HaGadol.

== Melodies ==
There are various melodies for "Yom le-yabbashah". It has become a beloved and well-known hymn in Sephardic and Ashkenazic communities. In Moroccan communities, it is sung in the Bakashot tradition, typically in the Higazi maqam or on the seventh day of Passover in the Sakhli maqam, with different melodies.

In the Jerusalem Sephardic tradition, the piyyut has a melody composed by Ezra Aharon in the Neva'und maqam. This melody is well-known and popular in Jerusalem and is often sung on the seventh day of Passover.

Tripolitan Jews sing it with a lively rhythm in a maqam called Biyat, while Afghan Jews have a specific melody for the piyyut in the cheerful Ajam maqam.
