= Baal keriah =

Synagogue member who reads from the Sefer Torah

A baal keriah (Hebrew: בַּעַל קְרִיאָה, romanized: baʿal qəriʾā, lit. 'master of the reading'), colloquially called the baal korei (בַּעַל קוֹרֵא, baʿal qôrē 'master-reader'), is a member of a Jewish congregation who reads from the Torah scroll during the service. As there are no niqqud, punctuation, or cantillation marks (called trop in Yiddish) in a Sefer Torah, and these are required features of the reading, the baal keriah must memorize them beforehand.

== Arrangement ==
When the Torah scroll is placed on the bimah, or reading table, the baal keriah approaches the bimah by the most direct route possible and stands in front of the scroll, a little to the left. If necessary, the scroll is rolled to the portion to be read and then closed and covered with the mantle. To the left side of the scroll stands the gabbai, who calls up congregants to honor them with an aliyah. To the right of the scroll stands the second gabbai, the gabbai sheni.

== Before each aliyah ==
When called up by the first gabbai, the oleh comes by the most direct route possible and stands to the right of the baal keriah. A gabbai uncovers the scroll and the baal keriah indicates to the oleh which section will be read. In some communities, he only shows the beginning; in others, he points to the beginning and the end. The oleh then touches the corner of his tallit or some other holy piece of cloth, like the belt of the Torah scroll, or for scrolls with hard cases, the kerchief used to roll the scroll, to the indicated section and kisses it. He then rolls the scroll closed, holding on the right and left rollers (or sides of the case), turns slightly to the right and recites the blessings over the reading. The congregation answers "amen," the scroll is unrolled again, and then the baal keriah chants the section, holding onto the left roller and pointing, usually with a specially-made ornate pointer called a yad in his right.

=== During the aliyah ===
The oleh reads quietly along with the ball keriah from the scroll during the chanting. Each gabbai will also read along with the baal keriah from Humashim, to let the baal keriah know of any errors. In some congregations, a gabbai will give cheironomic signals to indicate how the verses should be chanted. All those at the bimah stand for the reading. During certain significant sections of the Torah, like the Ten Commandments or the Song of the Sea, the congregation stands as well. These sections are typically chanted in a more ornate and majestic tune than usual.

=== End of the aliyah ===
At the end of the reading, the custom of the baal korei may dictate that he raise his voice at the cadence of the final verse, or simply finish with the usual tune for all verses. The oleh kisses the section just read in similar fashion to before the reading. The oleh then closes the scroll, holding onto both the rollers as before, turns slightly to the right and recites the concluding blessings. The congregation answers "amen," the scroll is covered, and the oleh stands next to the gabbai sheini until the next oleh finishes his reading. At that point, the oleh circles counter-clockwise about the bimah, taking the longest path back to his seat, as if reluctant to leave the Torah. The baal keriah remains standing in place at the bimah until all the readings from the scroll are complete.

=== Sabbath and festivals: penultimate and maftir readings ===
On the Sabbath and holidays, the baal keriah will recite the half kaddish at the bimah after the penultimate reading. The oleh for the final reading (the maftir) is particularly honored with reading the haftara after the maftir reading from the Torah scroll is complete. Usually, the maftir is the final three verses of the weekly portion, which are repeated from the last aliyah. On special occasions, readings from other parts of the Torah will be read instead, relating specifically to the occasion. The maftir reading is read from the second scroll if other Torah scrolls are available. Otherwise, the first scroll is rolled to the place of the maftir, and the maftir is read from the same scroll.

After the maftir reading, the scroll is raised, shown to the congregation, and then wrapped in decorative and protective garb. The baal keriah then joins the rest of the congregation in listening and reading the haftara quietly along with the maftir.

=== Weekday readings ===
On Mondays and Thursdays when there is no holiday, no haftara is read. Also, only three olim are called up, and each aliyah is usually much shorter than the full Sabbath readings, not covering the entire weekly portion read on the Sabbath. Otherwise, the sequence is almost the same.

=== Ending a book ===
After completing one of the five books of the Torah, it is customary for the congregation to call out חֲזַק חֲזַק וְנִתְחַזַּק! ḥăzaq ḥăzaq wəniṯḥazzaq!, meaning "Let us strong! Be strong! And may we be strengthened!", after the final verse. The baal keriah will repeat this phrase after the congregation, and the oleh will recite the blessings after the reading.

=== Discovering a scribal error ===
If a possible scribal error is discovered during the reading, the reading is halted while those knowledgeable approach to examine the scroll. A child may also be brought to see whether he can recognize an ambiguous letter. If the scroll is kosher, the reading continues from the verse where it was halted. If the scroll is pasul, or invalid, a replacement scroll is brought out, while the invalid scroll is set aside for repair at the first opportunity. The reading then continues from where it left off.

=== Baal keriah as the oleh ===
If the baal keriah is himself called up as the oleh, he stands alone in front of the scroll, kisses the section to be read as usual, and recites the preparatory blessings like other olim. As he chants from the scroll, he either holds both of the rollers without pointing, or a gabbai holds a roller so that the baal keriah can use the pointer to keep his place.

== Readings aside from the Torah scroll ==
=== Haftara ===
In some congregations, the haftara is also read from handwritten scrolls. In others, the haftara is read from printed Chumashim or specially-printed sifre haftarot, containing only the Haftarot, usually in enlarged type. As with the Torah scroll, handwritten scrolls for the haftara contain no vowels, punctuation or trop, so the reading must be memorized. Less preparation is necessary when reading from works containing the niqqud. As with the Torah reading, blessings are recited before and after the reading, and the reader stands as he chants it.

=== Megillah ===
The Book of Esther is read during the festival of Purim, commemorating the rescue of the Jewish people from a genocidal decree written and promulgated by Haman. Instead of the Jews being annihilated, the plan was foiled, and Haman himself was hung on the gallows he originally built for the leader of the Jews. When reading the Megillah, the procedure for reading is somewhat different. It is customary to unroll the entire scroll and fold it over in three sections for the reading, like a letter. The tune for chanting is more joyous, and pauses are made to allow the congregation to drown out the villain's name, Haman. Like the Torah scroll, the Megillah contains no vowels, punctuation or cantillation markings, and the text must be learned beforehand. As with the Torah scroll, blessings are recited before and after the reading, lasting 10–30 minutes. Unlike any other reading during the year from other Scriptures, the baal korei must chant every word from the scroll, and each congregant must hear each word to fulfill the commandment of the Megillah. Also, as with the Torah scroll, the baal keriah reads while standing, although the congregation may sit.

=== Lamentations ===
The Book of Lamentations, known as Eichah from its first word, is read on Tisha B'Av, the anniversary of the destruction of both the First and Second Temples. It is read in a sad tune, with all present, including the baal keriah, sitting on low cushions or chairs on the ground like mourners. No blessings are recited before and after the reading, although supplications are recited. At night, it is customary to read by candlelight. At the beginning of each chapter, the baal keriah raises his voice. The reading of Eichah is not a commandment to the same degree as the Torah, haftara, and megillat Ester, so it is common to chant it from a printed text rather than from a handwritten scroll.

== Assignment of the baal keriah ==
No special ordination is required to be a baal keriah, although one should be bar mitzvah age or older. In some congregations, the rabbi serves as the baal keriah; in others, the cantor or one of the congregants is the baal keriah. If there is no professional baal keriah available, and there is a minyan, one of the other congregants should prepare the reading in advance to allow the Torah to be read with its proper vowels, punctuation and trop.

== Preparation ==
To practice for the Torah reading, a baal keriah will usually use a book called a tikkun. This contains two copies of the text in parallel columns. One column has the text as it appears in the handwritten Torah scroll, without vowels or other markings. The other column contains the vowelized and punctuated text with the cantillation marks. Often, such Tikkunim will have a collection of laws and treatises on Biblical Hebrew grammar relevant to the baal keriah. The Tikkun will also often have other texts, like the Megillah and the Haftarot.

== History ==
Before the 12th century, all olim would read their aliyah, which Yemenite Jews continue to do. As the knowledge to read the scrolls became more scarce, it became common to designate a person who would chant from the scroll throughout the year to avoid embarrassing the olim.

During the Second Temple era, it was also customary to gather all the people at the Temple in Jerusalem every seven years to hear the king read the Torah, a practice known as the hakhel.

== See also ==
- Eichah
