= Torah reading =

Jewish tradition that involves the public reading from a Torah scroll

Torah reading (Hebrew: קריאת התורה, romanized: K'riat haTorah, lit. '"Reading [of] the Torah"'; Ashkenazic pronunciation: Kriyas haTorah) is a Jewish religious tradition that involves the public reading of a set of passages from a Torah scroll. The term often refers to the entire ceremony of removing the scroll (or scrolls) from the Torah ark, chanting the appropriate excerpt with special cantillations (tropes), and then returning the scroll(s) to the Torah Ark.

This practice is also commonly called 'leyening, a loanword from Yiddish: לייענען, romanized: leyenen, lit. 'to read, to read out loud'. It is also spelt lain, leyn, layn, or otherwise, as the use of a standardized romanization of Yiddish in popular culture is irregular at best.

Regular public reading of the Torah was introduced by Ezra after the return of the Judean exiles from the Babylonian captivity c. 537 BCE as described in the Book of Nehemiah. In the modern era, Orthodox Jews practice Torah reading according to a set procedure almost unchanged since the Talmudic era. Since the 19th century, Reform and Conservative Judaism have made some adaptations to the practice of Torah reading, but the basic pattern has usually remained the same.

As a part of the morning or afternoon prayer services on certain days of the week or holidays, a section of the five books of the Torah is read from a scroll. On Shabbat (Saturday) mornings, a weekly section (known as a sedra or parashah) is read, selected so that the Torah is read consecutively each year. Conservative and Reform synagogues may read parashot on a triennial rather than annual schedule. On Sabbath afternoons, Mondays, and Thursdays, the beginning of the following the Shabbat portion is read. On Jewish holidays (including Hanukkah and Purim as well as the periods known as Chol HaMoed), Rosh Chodesh, and ta'anit (fast days), special readings connected to the day are read.

Many Jews observe an annual holiday, Simchat Torah, to celebrate the completion of the year's cycle of readings.

== Origins and history of the practice ==
The introduction of public reading of the Torah by Ezra is described in Nehemiah 8. However, the reading of the Torah in sections three times a week is said to date back to the time of Moses, according to the Mishneh Torah, Hilchot Tefillah 12:1.

The mitzvah of Torah reading was based on the Biblical commandment of Hakhel in Deuteronomy 10–13, by which once every seven years the entire people was to be gathered, "men, women and children," and hear much of Deuteronomy, the final volume of the Torah, read to them by the king.

Torah reading is discussed in the Mishna and Talmud, primarily in tractate Megilla.

It has been suggested that the reading of the Torah was due to a desire to controvert the views of the Samaritans with regard to the various Jewish festivals, for which reason arrangements were made to have the passages of the Torah relating to those festivals read and expounded on the feast-days themselves.

=== Triennial cycle ===
An alternative triennial cycle of Torah readings also existed at that time, a system whereby each week a sedra was read; that portion was approximately a third of the current parasha. According to the Jewish Encyclopedia, the triennial cycle "was the practice in Palestine, whereas in Babylonia the entire [Torah] was read in the synagogue in the course of a single year." As late as 1170, Benjamin of Tudela mentioned Egyptian congregations that took three years to read the Torah. and this is corroborated by Maimonides, who mentions in his Mishneh Torah that a few communities in his time still read the Torah in three years.

Joseph Jacobs, in the Jewish Encyclopedia article mentioned, notes that the transition from the triennial to the annual reading of the Law and the transference of the beginning of the cycle to the month of Tishri are attributed by Sándor Büchler to the influence of the amora Abba Arikha (175–247):

This may have been due to the smallness of the sedarim under the old system, and to the fact that people were thus reminded of the chief festivals only once in three years. It was then arranged that Deut. xxviii. should fall before the New Year, and that the beginning of the cycle should come immediately after the Feast of Tabernacles. This arrangement has been retained by the Karaites and by modern congregations.

The current practice in Orthodox synagogues follows the annual or 'Babylonian' cycle. At the time of the publication of the Jewish Encyclopedia (1901–06), the author noted that there were only "slight traces of the triennial cycle in the four special Sabbaths and in some of the passages read upon the festivals, which are frequently sections of the triennial cycle, and not of the annual one".

In the 19th and 20th centuries, some Conservative (as evidenced in the Etz Hayim Humash) and most Reform, Reconstructing, and Renewal congregations have switched to a triennial cycle, where the first third of each parashah is read one year, the second third the next year and the final third in a third year. This must be distinguished from the ancient practice, which was to read each seder in serial order regardless of the week of the year, completing the entire Torah in three (or three and a half) years in a linear fashion.

== Occasions when the Torah is read ==
The beginning of each weekly Torah portion (usually the first segment of seven) from the Torah is read during Mincha on Shabbat and at Shaharit (morning services) on Mondays and Thursdays. The entire weekly parashah is read on Shabbat mornings. Most major and minor festival and fast days have a unique Torah reading devoted to that day. The Torah is also read during afternoon services on fast days and Yom Kippur.

When the Torah is read in the morning, it comes after Tachanun or Hallel, or, if these are omitted, immediately after the Amidah. The Torah reading is followed by the recitation of the Hatzi Kaddish.

When the Torah is read during Minha, it occurs immediately before the Amidah.

== Procedure ==
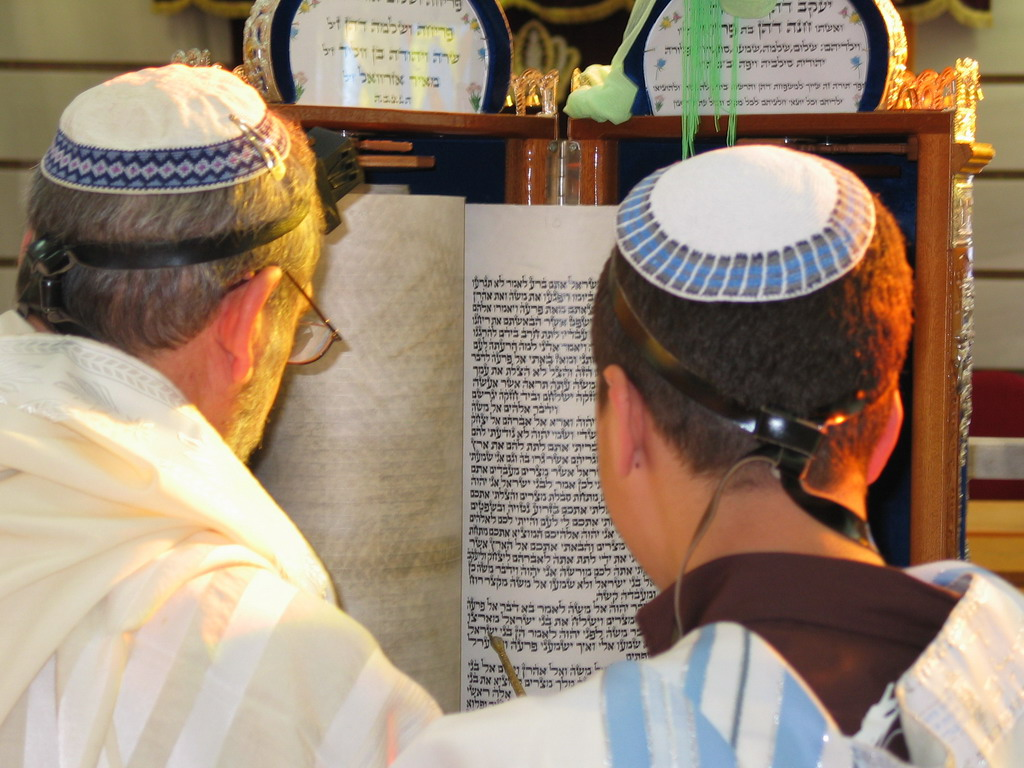
Reading from the Torah according to Sephardic custom

The term "Torah reading" is often used to refer to the entire ceremony of taking the Torah scroll(s) from the ark, reading excerpts from it to a special tune, and returning the scroll(s) to the ark.

The Torah scroll is stored in an ornamental cabinet, a Torah ark, designed specifically for scrolls. The Holy Ark is usually found in the front of the sanctuary, and is a central element of synagogue architecture. When needed for reading, the Torah is removed from the ark by someone chosen for the honor from among the congregants; specific prayers are recited as it is removed. The Torah is then carried by hazzan to the bima, a platform or table from which it will be read. The congregation recites further prayers while this is done.

Ikuv keriah, rarely practiced today, was a procedure by which community members could have their grievances addressed by interfering with the service at the time the Torah was removed from the ark.

=== Hagbaha ===
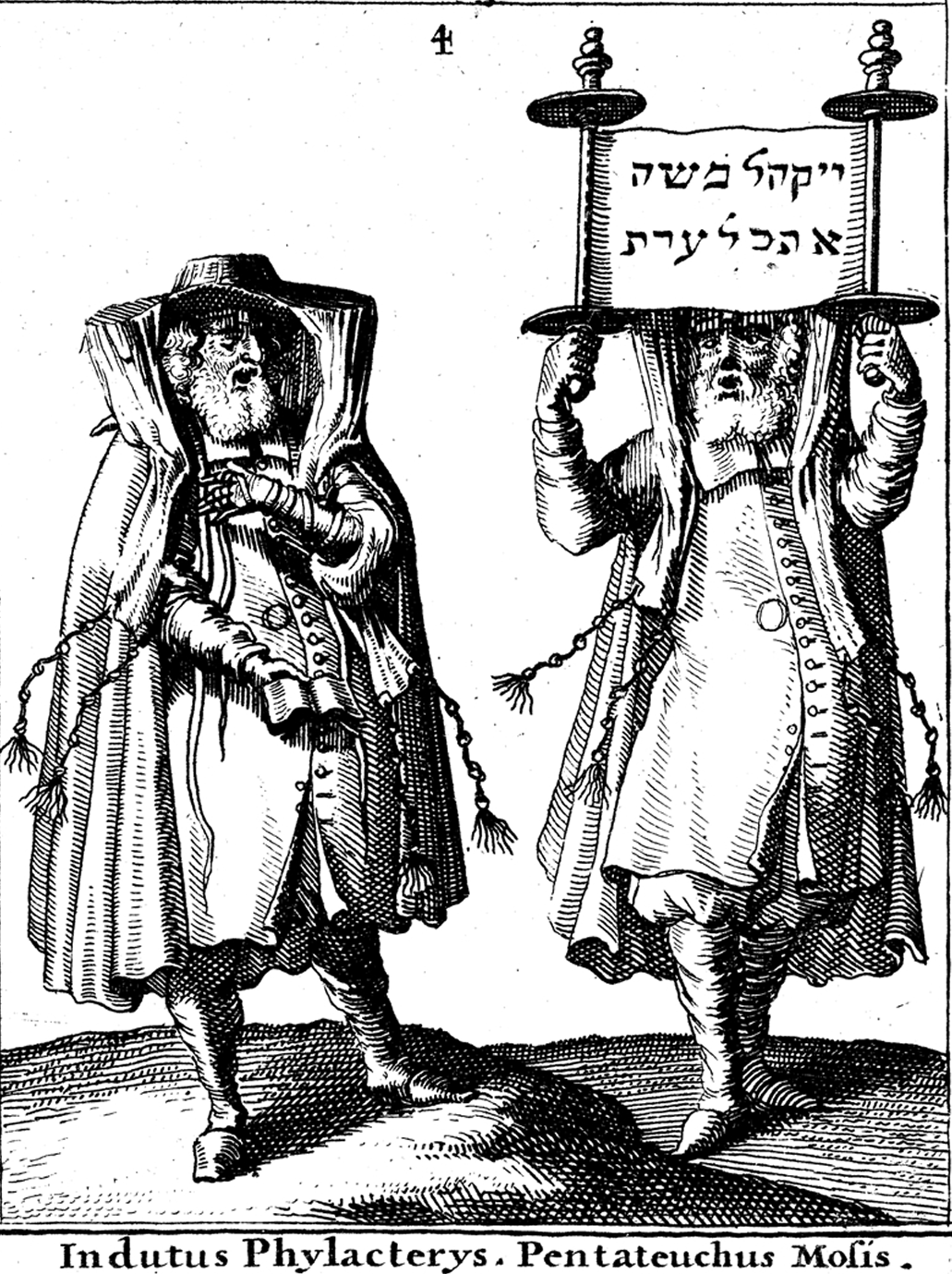
1657 depiction of hagbaha (right)

In the Sefardic tradition, the Torah is lifted before the reading, a practice called levantar, Judaeo-Spanish for "to lift up". In the Yemenite tradition, the Torah remains in a resting position while just the parchment is raised.

In Ashkenazi tradition, lifting is called hagbaha and is usually done after the reading, although some Nusach Sefard communities, especially in Israel, have adopted the Sephardic custom of doing it before the reading. The order was a matter of medieval dispute, but the position of the Kol Bo, lifting before, eventually lost to that of Moses Isserles, and is followed in only a few Ashkenazic communities. Two honorees are called: the magbiah 'lifter' performs hagbaha, displaying the text for all to see, after which the golel 'roller' performs the gelila 'rolling [of the Torah]' and puts on the cover, belt, crown, and/or other ornaments (this role, originally distinguished, is now often given to minors). In Conservative, Reform, Reconstructionist, and some Open Orthodox congregations, these roles may also be performed by a woman. The respective titles for women are "Magbihah" and "Golelet". Rashi says on Megillah 32a that these roles were originally performed by the same honoree.

As the Hagbaha is performed, the congregation points toward the Torah scroll with their pinky fingers and recites Deut. 4:44, " ", adding, "on the word of YHWH, by hand of Moses." The custom of pointing has no clear origin. The medieval Ashkenazi custom, according to Moses Isserles, was to bow toward the scroll during Hagbaha; pointing is mentioned by Mordechai Krispin of Rhodes (c. 1730-1790) in a work published by his grandson in 1836; pointing with the pinky, first recorded as a "Russian" custom by the 1912 Jewish Encyclopedia, was codified by the Me'am Lo'ez in 1969. Twentieth-century additions to the Me'am Loez were written by an Ashkenazi, Shmuel Kroizer, but the Sephardic prestige of the work has helped the custom become near-universal among both Sephardic and Ashkenazi Jews.

In Ashkenazic congregations, the magbiah will usually sit holding the scroll until after the haftara is performed and the chazzan takes it from him to return it to the ark. In some congregations, the scroll is instead placed on the bima or handed to a different honoree (frequently a minor) to sit and hold.

=== Aliyot ===
A synagogue official, called a gabbai, then calls up several people (men in most Orthodox and some Conservative congregations, and any adult in others) in turn, to be honored with an aliyah (Hebrew: עליה, pl. עליות aliyot; 'ascent'). The honoree, or oleh (plural olim), stands at the bima and recites a blessing, after which either the oleh or, more usually, a designated reader reads a section of the day's Torah portion, followed by another blessing recited by the oleh.

There are always at least three aliyot in a given Torah-reading service:

Number of aliyot	Occasion
3	Mondays and Thursdays, Shabbat afternoon, fast days (morning and afternoon), Hanukkah, Purim, Yom Kippur afternoon
4	Rosh Chodesh, Chol HaMoed
5	Passover (Yom Tov days only, excluding the chol hamoed), Shavuot, Rosh Hashanah, Sukkot (Yom Tov days only, excluding chol hamoed), Shemini Atzeret, Simchat Torah
6	Yom Kippur morning
7	Shabbat (Saturday) morning

On Saturday mornings, there are seven olim, the maximum of any day, but more may be added if desired, by subdividing these seven aliyot or repeating passages (according to the custom of some communities). When a festival or Yom Kippur coincides with Shabbat the readings are divided into seven aliyot instead of five or six.

In most congregations, the oleh does not read the Torah aloud. Rather, he stands near it while a practiced expert, called a ba'al qeri'ah ("one in charge of reading"; sometimes ba'al kore), reads the Torah with cantillation for the congregation. The oleh follows along with the expert, reading in a whisper. In Yemenite communities, the oleh reads the portion himself, while on the Sabbath and Festival mornings another person, usually a young boy, recites the targum after each verse.

In both Orthodox and Conservative congregations, it is common practice to give out an aliyah to a man (or woman, in Conservative congregations) who has just recovered from a serious illness, or returned from a long trip, or survived some other significant danger, in order to allow him (or her) to recite a special blessing, known as "benching gomel", although technically one can "bench gomel" even without receiving an Aliyah.

Aliyot are also given to a groom-to-be, or, in egalitarian congregations, to the bride-to-be and groom-to-be together, in a pre-wedding ceremony known as an aufruf.

In Jewish custom, baby boys are named in a special ceremony, known as a brit milah, but baby girls are often named during the Torah reading, with the father (in non-egalitarian congregations) or both parents (in egalitarian congregations) being called up for an aliyah prior to the naming, and a special blessing for the baby.

==== The first Aliyah ====
According to Halachah, followed by Orthodox Judaism, the first oleh (person called to read) is a Kohen, the second a Levite, the third oleh is Yisra'el: Jews who are neither Kohen nor Levite. Regarding subsequent Aliyot (4–7 on the Sabbath), according to the Ashkenazic tradition, these must be given to Yisr'elim, whereas according to the Sephardic tradition, they can be given to anyone. This assumes that such people are available; is there is no Kohen, a Yisrael is traditionally called for the first Aliyah, and halachic authorities debate whether in such a case a Levi may be called for the first Aliyah. If no Levi is present, the same Kohen is traditionally called for the first two Aliyot. If only Kohanim or Leviim are present, they are traditionally called one after the other, and if in such a situation there is one Yisrael, he can be called for the first Aliyah. The first two aliyot are sometimes referred to as "Kohen " and "Levi (or simply as rishon and sheini, especially on shabbat morning)," while the rest are known by their number (in Hebrew). This practice is also followed in some but not all Conservative synagogues. Reform and Reconstructing Judaism have abolished special ritual roles for the descendants of the Biblical priestly and levitical castes.

Each oleh, after being called to the Torah, approaches it, recites a benediction, a portion is read, and the oleh concludes with another benediction. Then the next oleh is called.

=== Gelila ===
After the reading, if the Torah is not in a wooden case, the Golel ("roller") performs Gelila ("rolling up"), then binds the Torah with a sash and replaces the Torah's cover. This honor is sometimes given to a child under Bar Mitzvah age.

=== Maftir ===
On days when a haftara is read, there is a final aliyah after the kaddish, called maftir. The person called to that aliyah, as well, is known as "the maftir." On holidays, maftir is read from the Torah verses describing the sacrifices brought in the Temple in Jerusalem on that particular holiday. In progressive synagogues alternative readings are read. On a regular Sabbath that does not have a special Maftir, the maftir is a repetition of the last few verses of the parsha.

When the Torah is read on Tisha Bav in the morning, on the afternoon of a fast day, and on Yom Kippur afternoon, the third aliyah is considered the maftir, and is followed immediately by the haftara.

=== haftara ===
On Saturday and holiday mornings, as well as on Tisha B'av in the morning (in many communities), the afternoons of fast days (in many communities) and Yom Kippur, the Torah reading concludes with the haftara – a reading from one of the Nevi'im. The haftara usually relates in some way to either the Torah reading of that day, a theme of the holiday, or the time of year.

=== Returning the Torah ===
The Torah scroll is then returned to its ark to the accompaniment of specific prayers.

In Ashkenazic communities, the Chazzan takes the Torah scroll in his right arm and recites "Let them praise the name of HaShem, for his name alone will have been exalted." The congregation then responds with Psalm 148:13–14. In other communities, the verses recited may differ.

== What is read ==
The cycle of weekly readings is fixed. Because the Hebrew calendar varies from year to year, two readings are sometimes combined so that the entire Pentateuch is read over the course of a year.

=== Weekly portion ===
On Shabbat mornings, the weekly Torah portion (parashah) is read. It is divided into seven or more aliyot (see above for more on aliyot).

=== Daily portion ===
On Monday and Thursday mornings (except if there is another special reading) and on Saturday afternoons, a small section of the upcoming week's parashah is read, divided into three aliyot

=== Jewish holidays ===
On Jewish holidays, the reading relates to the day. For example, on Passover the congregation reads various sections of the Pentateuch that relate to that holiday.

=== Order of precedence for special readings ===
When multiple special occasions occur at the same time, there is a standard order of precedence. Generally speaking, when major Jewish holidays occur on Shabbat the holiday portion is read, although divided into the seven portions for Shabbat rather than the number appropriate for the holiday — there is a special reading for when Shabbat coincides with the Chol HaMoed (intermediate days) of Passover or Sukkot. However, when Shabbat coincides with minor holidays, such as Rosh Chodesh (New month) or Hanukkah, the regular reading for Shabbat is read, plus an additional reading (maftir) relevant to the occasion. The additional reading is read from a second scroll if available. On rare occasions, such as when a Rosh Chodesh falls on a Shabbat that also commemorates another occasion, such as Hanukkah or when one of the four special additional readings read prior to Passover (Shekalim or Hachodesh), there are two additional readings and three scrolls (if available) are read; in such a case the regular Parsha is divided up into six readings, the seventh reading is for Rosh Chodesh, and the maftir is for the other special occasion.

== Simchat Torah ==
On Simchat Torah (Hebrew: שמחת תורה, lit. 'Joyous celebration of the Torah'), the order of weekly readings is completed, and the day is celebrated with various customs involving the Torah. In many communities, the Torah is read at night – a unique occurrence, preceded in many communities by seven rounds of song and dance (hakafot, sing. hakafah; some communities have hakafot without subsequently reading the Torah.) During the hakafot, most or all of the synagogue's Torah scrolls are removed from the Holy Ark, and carried around the Bimah by members of the congregation.

On the day of Simchat Torah (in Judaism, day follows night), some communities repeat the seven rounds of song and dance to varying degrees, while in others the Torah scrolls are only carried around the Bimah (seven times) symbolically. Afterwards, many communities have the custom of calling every member of the congregation for an aliyah, which is accomplished by repeatedly re-reading the day's five aliyot. The process is often expedited by splitting the congregants into multiple rooms, to each of which a Torah is brought for the reading, and traditionally care must be taken that a minyan is present for the entirety of each reading.

Following the regular aliyot, the honor of Hatan Torah ("Groom of the Torah") is given to a distinguished member of the congregation, who is called for an aliyah in which the remaining verses of the Torah are read, to complete that year's reading. Another member of the congregation is honored with Hatan Bereishit ("Groom of Genesis"), and receives an aliyah in which the first verses of the Torah, containing the creation account of Genesis, are read (a second copy of the Torah is usually used, so that the first need not be rolled all the way to the beginning while the congregants wait). In the Italian Nusach, this reading is read from a printed book without reciting a blessing. Afterwards, the services proceed in the usual manner, with the maftir and haftarah for Simchat Torah.

== Women and Torah reading ==
=== Orthodox congregations ===
The Talmud states that "anyone can be called up to read from the Torah, even a minor and even a woman, but our sages taught that we do not call a woman on account of Kevod Hatzibur" (the dignity of the congregation; Megillah 23a). This statement is mirrored in the Shulchan Aruch, Orach Hayim 282:3.

Based on this in most Orthodox congregations, only men are called to the Torah. This term is interpreted in numerous ways by various sources.

- It would slight the community because it would appear to others that the men in the community were not well educated enough to read from the Torah because it was assumed that a community would not have a woman read from the Torah if there were men who could do so.
- It imposes unnecessary bother on the congregation, or that disturbs the seriousness and propriety of the synagogue service.
- In the time of the Talmud and Shulchan Aruch, women were widely considered second-class members of society, and therefore women were not worthy representatives of the community.

==== Traditional congregations ====
Mendel Shapiro and Daniel Sperber permit women to participate in regular Torah reading on Shabbat, in services known as "partnership minyanim". This innovation is not accepted in Orthodox communities, including almost all Modern Orthodox communities. Prominent Modern Orthodox posqim, including Hershel Schachter, Mordechai Willig, Nisson Alpert, and others have ruled that this practice is not permitted.

A small number of Modern Orthodox congregations have added all-female prayer groups, where women are permitted to read the Torah to an audience of women, though without blessings, aliyot, or associated liturgy. The Chief Rabbi of the Commonwealth, Rabbi Ephraim Mirvis stated that women were not permitted to read from the Torah in the United Synagogues.

=== Conservative, Reform, Reconstructionist, and Renewal ===
Most but not all Conservative congregations permit women to have an aliyah for at least part of the reading. Many Conservative congregations, and nearly all Reform, Reconstructionist, and Renewal congregations, practice complete gender egalitarianism.

== Conservative Judaism ==
Conservative Judaism generally follows practices for Torah reading similar to Orthodox Judaism except that:

- In most but not all Conservative synagogues, women can receive an aliyah and can chant from the Torah out loud ("leyen"). This has been an option for Conservative synagogues since 1955.
- In some Conservative synagogues, women who are benot kohen (daughter of a Kohen) or benot levi (daughter of a Levite) can be called for the first or second aliyot. In Israel and some congregations in North America, only men are permitted to be called for the Kohen and Levite aliyot even if women can be called for the other aliyot.
- Some Conservative synagogues do not call a Kohen or a Levite first at all, although Conservative Judaism as a whole retains some elements of special tribal roles.
- Some Conservative congregations use a triennial cycle, reading approximately a third of the Torah every year and completing the reading in three years.

== Reform, Reconstructionist, and Renewal Judaism ==
In addition to changes mentioned above for Conservative Judaism, these movements generally practice:

- complete gender egalitarianism;
- abolition of tribal distinctions among kohen, levi, and yisrael on grounds of egalitarianism. In some cases (such as Bar or Bat Mitzvah ceremonies) only one person will read the text;
- aliyot may be given out as a means of honoring members for their contributions to the congregation instead of on the basis of the ancient castes.
- abridgement of the portion read (sometimes by instituting a triennial cycle) and reducing of the number of aliyot (most congregations);
- some congregations may modify the order of the portions read;
- main Shabbat service on Friday night with Torah reading (some Reform congregations);
- some synagogues will give the option for the reader either to chant or simply read aloud the text;

=== Torah Tape ===
A Torah Tape is a recording of a lecture on a Torah topic. Historically these were physical tapes, Initially, Torah Tape patrons would purchase the tapes for a dollar a piece, but later on it moved to a lending-library model, under which they were either sold or loaned by Torah Tape libraries. Today content is available from web sites, at times on a subscription model.

By 2019 the number of tapes produced was in the millions, including the public lectures by Avigdor Miller. Torah Tape libraries have been opened beyond the NY/Tri-state area. Yissocher Frand's Torah Tapes are recordings of lectures he gives in Baltimore

== See also ==
- Aliyah (Torah)
- Weekly Torah portion
- Hebrew cantillation
- Haftarah
- Minyan
- Sefer Torah
- Torah ark
- Yom Tov Torah readings
- Torah study
- Yad

=== Other religions ===
- Qur'an reading, in Islam
- Lesson, in Christianity
- Bible study, private or small group reading predominantly in Protestant Christianity
