= Special Shabbat =

Shabbat days on which special events are commemorated

Special Shabbatot are Jewish Shabbat (Hebrew: שבת) days on which special events are commemorated. Variations in the liturgy and special customs differentiate them from the other Shabbats (Hebrew: שבתות) and each one is referred to by a special name. Many communities also add piyyutim on many of these special Shabbatot. Two such Shabbats, Shabbat Mevarchim—the Shabbat preceding a new Hebrew month—and Shabbat Rosh Chodesh (which coincides with the new month/moon) can occur on several occasions throughout the year. The other special Shabbats occur on specific sabbaths before or coinciding with certain Jewish holidays during the year according to a fixed pattern.

== Shabbat Shuvah – Return ==
Shabbat Shuvah or Shabbat Shubah or Shabbat Teshuvah (Hebrew: שבת שובה, lit. 'Sabbath [of] Return' or Hebrew: שבת תשובה, lit. 'Sabbath [of] Repentance') is the Shabbat that occurs during the Ten Days of Repentance, but is between (i.e. not including) the two consecutive Days of Rosh Hashanah, and the Day of Yom Kippur. The name Shabbat Shuvah comes from the first word of the Haftarah that is read on that day, which literally means "Return!" The main haftarah consists of Hosea 14:2–10 and this is all that is read in Yemenite communities; other communities add Joel 2:11–27 and/or Micah 7:18–20. It is alternately known as Shabbat Shuvah owing to its being one of the Aseret Yemei Teshuvah (Ten Days of Repentance). Traditionally, a lengthy and expansive sermon is given by the Rabbi to the general community in the afternoon, as is also the case with Shabbat HaGadol.

== Shabbat Hanukkah ==
Shabbat Hanukkah (Hebrew: שבת חנוכה, lit. 'Sabbath of Hanukkah') is the Shabbat that falls during the eight days of Hanukkah, usually the Shabbat of Miketz. When the first day of Hanukkah is a Saturday, the eighth day is one as well, and the festival has two such Sabbaths. On Friday the Hanukkah lights are kindled before sunset and before the Shabbat candles, and on Saturday night only after Shabbat ends. Authorities differ on whether Havdalah or the Hanukkah lights come first. Two Torah scrolls are used: the weekly portion is read from the first, and the maftir reads the Hanukkah portion from Numbers 7 from the second. The haftarah is Zechariah's vision of the golden menorah (Zechariah). On a second Shabbat Hanukkah the haftarah is instead 1 Kings 7:40–50, on the lampstands made for Solomon's Temple. When Shabbat Hanukkah coincides with Rosh Chodesh Tevet, three Torah scrolls are used and the Hanukkah haftarah takes precedence over the Rosh Chodesh one. In Ashkenazi rites the piyyut "Shene Zetim" by Solomon ibn Gabirol was traditionally recited.

== Shabbat Shirah – Song ==
Shabbat Shirah (Hebrew: שבת שירה, lit. 'Shabbat of Song') is the name given to the Shabbat that includes parashat Beshalach. The Torah reading of the week contains the Song of the Sea (Book of Exodus 15:1–18). This was the song by the Israelites after crossing the Red Sea. There is no special Torah reading. The haftarah includes the Song of Deborah. There is an Ashkenazi custom to put out bird feeders on Friday afternoon to feed birds on this Shabbat, in recognition of their help to Moses in the Desert. Some communities recite the piyyut "Yom le-yabbashah".

== The Four Parshiyot ==
These are four special Sabbaths, each of which derives its name from the additional Torah portion that is read that day. Two of the Sabbaths occur in the weeks leading up to Purim and two in the weeks then leading up to Passover.

=== Shabbat Sheqalim ===
Shabbat Sheqalim (Hebrew: שבת שקלים, lit. 'Shabbat of shekels"') requests each male adult Jew to contribute half of a Biblical shekel for the upkeep of the Tabernacle. The weekly Torah portion is the first section of Ki Tissa. This shabbat takes place before or on 1 Adar. In leap years of the Hebrew calendar, when there are two months of Adar, Shabbat Shekalim is before or on 1 Adar II.

=== Shabbat Zachor – of Remembrance ===
Shabbat Zachor (Hebrew: שבת זכור, lit. 'Sabbath [of] remembrance') is the Shabbat immediately preceding Purim. Deuteronomy 25:17-19 (at the end of Parasha Ki Teitzei), describing the attack on the weakest by Amalek, is recounted. There is a tradition from the Talmud (understood to be implied in the Megillah itself) that Haman, the antagonist of the Purim story, was descended from Amalek. The portion that is read includes a commandment to remember the attack by Amalek, and therefore at this public reading both men and women make a special effort to hear the reading.

=== Shabbat Parah ===
Shabbat Parah (Hebrew: שבת פרה, lit. 'Shabbat of the red heifer') precedes Shabbat HaḤodesh in preparation for Passover. The first reading of Ḥuqat, the weekly Torah portion, describes the red heifer in the Temple in Jerusalem as part of the manner in which the kohanim and the Jews purified themselves so that they would be ready ("pure") for the Passover sacrifice.

=== Shabbat HaḤodesh ===
Shabbat HaḤodesh (Hebrew: שבת החודש, lit. 'Shabbat of the Month') precedes or occurs on 1 Nisan, during which Passover is celebrated. A special maftir, the second reading of Bo, is read, in which the laws of Passover are defined. On the first day of Nisan, God presented the first commandment of how to "sanctify the new moon" (qiddush haḥodesh) for the onset of Rosh Chodesh and thus Nisan becomes the first month of the Jewish year (counting by months).

== Shabbat HaGadol ==
Shabbat HaGadol (Hebrew: שבת הגדול, lit. 'The Great Shabbat') is the Shabbat immediately before Passover. The first Shabbat HaGadol took place in Egypt on 10 Nisan five days before the Israelite Exodus. On that day, the Israelites were given their first commandment which applied only to that Shabbat, "On the tenth day of this month (Nisan)... each man should take a lamb for the household, a lamb for each home (Exodus 12:3). There is a special Haftarah reading on this Shabbat of the book of Malachi. Traditionally, a lengthy and expansive sermon is given by the Rabbi to the general community in the afternoon, as is also the case on Shabbat Shuvah.

Various reasons are given for the name of this Shabbat:

1. The Midrash Rabba states: “When they (the Jewish people) set aside their paschal lamb on that Shabbat, the firstborn gentiles gathered near the Israelites and asked them why they were doing this. The following was their response: “This is a Pesach offering to God who will kill the firstborn Egyptians.” They (the firstborn) went to their fathers and to Pharaoh to request that they grant permission to send the Jewish people free, but they refused. The firstborn then waged a war against them, and many of them were killed. This is the meaning of the verse (Psalms 136:10): “Who struck Egypt through its firstborn; for His kindness is eternal”.
2. The Arba'ah Turim states: The lamb was the Egyptian deity. Many Jews, after 210 years of immersion within Egyptian civilization, had also adopted this animal as their god. When God commanded that a lamb be set aside and tied to the bed for four days in anticipation of sacrifice, the Jewish people abandoned their idolatrous practice and courageously fulfilled this mitzvah in the eyes of the Egyptian people, thereby demonstrating their complete trust and faith in God. Nothing could have been more abominable to the Egyptians, for their god was to be slaughtered. Nevertheless, miraculously, the Egyptians were unable to utter a word or lift a hand. They watched helplessly as their god was being prepared for slaughter. This miracle was a great miracle (nes gadol) and gives this Shabbat its name.
3. The Peri Hadash writes: On this day the Jewish people were commanded to fulfill their first mitzvah – to set aside the lamb as a sacrifice. (Note: The mitzvah of Rosh Chodesh was not one they practically fulfilled at that time on that month.) This significant achievement is therefore referred to as 'Gadol'. Additionally, by fulfilling this first mitzvah they became like a child maturing into adulthood – they celebrated their Bar/Bat Mitzvah.
4. Moses Sofer writes: On this day, the Jewish people fully ‘returned’ to their commitment and faith in God. God is called gadol. Therefore, the Jews who embraced and subjugated themselves to God earned the title gadol as well.
5. Zedekiah ben Abraham Anaw writes that the customary lengthy Shabbat HaGadol speech makes the Shabbat feel long, drawn out, and ‘gadol’.
6. David Abudarham writes: In the haftara of the Shabbat prior to Pesach, we read the posuk [Malachi 3:23]: "Behold, I send you Elijah the prophet before the coming of the great and awesome day of the Lord." This reason places 'Shabbat HaGadol' in the same category as 'Shabbat Hazon', 'Shabbat Nahamu', and 'Shabbat Shuva', as their names are derived from the Haftara.
7. Every Shabbat preceding a festival or festival season is known as Shabbat HaGadol. (Shibolei Haleket)

== Shabbat Chazon – of Vision ==
Shabbat Chazon (Hebrew: שבת חזון, lit. 'Shabbat [of] vision') is named for the "Vision of Isaiah over Judah and Jerusalem" (Book of Isaiah 1:1-27) that is read as the Haftarah on this Shabbat at the end of the three weeks between dire straits, which precede the mournful fast of Tisha B'Av. It is also called black sabbath due to Isaiah's prophecy of rebuke predicting the destruction of the first temple in the siege of Jerusalem and its status as the saddest shabbat of the year (as opposed to the white sabbath, Shabbat Shuvah, immediately preceding Yom Kippur).

== Shabbat Nachamu ==
Shabbat Nachamu (Hebrew: שבת נחמו, lit. 'Shabbat [of] comfort/ing') takes its name from the haftarah from Isaiah in the Book of Isaiah 40:1-26 that speaks of "comforting" the Jewish people for their suffering. It is the first of seven haftarot of consolation leading up to the holiday of Rosh Hashanah, the Jewish New Year. It occurs on the Shabbat following Tisha B'Av. Shabbat Nachamu is traditionally celebrated with singing, dancing, eating, and musical performances that extend into the early hours of the following morning. Many customs ordain that the celebration should last until the earliest time for Shacharit(morning prayer services). It is also customary to lead into Shabbat Nachamu on Erev Shabbat/Friday with lively musical performance and dance, as well as to resume musical performances after Shacharit on Sunday until Mincha/evening prayer services.

In addition, Shabbat Nachamu is connected to Tu B'av according to some sources.

== Shabbat Mevarchim ==
Any Shabbat that precedes and begins the week during which there will be a day or days of a new Hebrew month (Rosh Chodesh) is known as Shabbat Mevarchim (mevarchim means "they [the congregation] bless" [the forthcoming new month].")

This prayer is recited after the Torah reading before the Torah scroll is carried back to the Torah ark, where it is stored in the synagogue.

Ashkenazi Jews refer to a Shabbos (Shabbat) like this as having Rosh Chodesh bentschen or bentschen Rosh Chodesh. (In Yiddish, bentschen means "(the act of) blessing". derived from Latin benedictio.) It is a custom that women make an extra effort to attend synagogue to hear and recite this prayer.

There are Hasidic communities, such as the Chabad community, who wake early in the morning on Shabbat to recite the entire Tehillim in shul, and who hold a gathering of extra rejoicing (known as a farbrengen), in honor of Shabbat Mevarchim.

If the day following Shabbat is Rosh Chodesh, a special haftarah ("Machar Chodesh" - I Samuel 20:18-42) is generally read; if Shabbat itself falls on Rosh Chodesh, both a special maftir (Numbers 28:9-15) and haftarah (Isaiah 66) are generally read, along with Hallel and a special Mussaf. These haftarot may be overridden by another special Shabbat, such as Shabbat Shekalim or Shabbat HaChodesh. Even so, in some communities the haftarah is concluded with the first and last lines of the haftarah of Machar Chodesh or Rosh Chodesh.

== Shabbat Chol HaMoed ==
Each Shabbat during Chol HaMoed, the "intermediate days" of Passover and Sukkot, is known as Shabbat Chol HaMoed ("[the] Shabbat [of the] intermediate days" שבת חול המועד) which occurs up to twice a year during the week-long festivals. It can occur once during Passover and once during Sukkot ("Tabernacles") or in both.

The regular weekly Torah portion is not read on these Sabbaths and instead there are special Torah readings based on the uniqueness of each holiday and the Three Pilgrim Festivals. There are also special maftirs ("additional Torah readings") and Haftarot (readings from the prophets.) See Haftarot for special Sabbaths, Festivals, and Fast Days.

=== Shabbat Chol Hamoed Pesach ===
The Shabbat during Chol HaMoed on Passover is known as Shabbat Chol Hamoed Pesach and in addition to the designated Torah reading, maftir, and haftarah readings for that day, the Song of Songs (Shir HaShirim) is read aloud in synagogue in its entirety with special cantillation prior to the Torah reading during services.

=== Shabbat Chol Hamoed Sukkot ===
The Shabbat during Chol HaMoed on Sukkot is known as Shabbat Chol Hamoed Sukkot and in addition to the designated Torah reading, maftir, and haftarah readings for that day, Ecclesiastes (Kohelet) is read aloud in synagogue in its entirety with special cantillation prior to the Torah reading during services.

== Shovavim ==
The word Shovavim is a Hebrew acronym for the Torah portions:

1. Shin - Shemot
2. Vav - Va'eira
3. Bet - Bo
4. Bet - Beshalach
5. Yud - Yitro
6. Mem - Mishpatim

The word Shovavim also means "mischief-makers".

One of each of the first six parashot of the Book of Exodus are read in the synagogue on Shabbat, typically during the Hebrew months of Tevet and Shevat (around January to February in the civil calendar). Kabbalah teaches that it is auspicious to repent of sins. Some people have the custom of fasting (ta'anit) and giving extra tzedakah during this time, and of reciting Selichot and other Kabbalistic prayers and tikkunim.

When it is a leap-year, two more weeks are added:

1. Terumah
2. Tetzaveh

== See also ==
- Havdalah
- Shabbat
- Yom le-yabbashah
