= Haftara =

Series of selections from the books of Nevi'im that is publicly read in synagogue

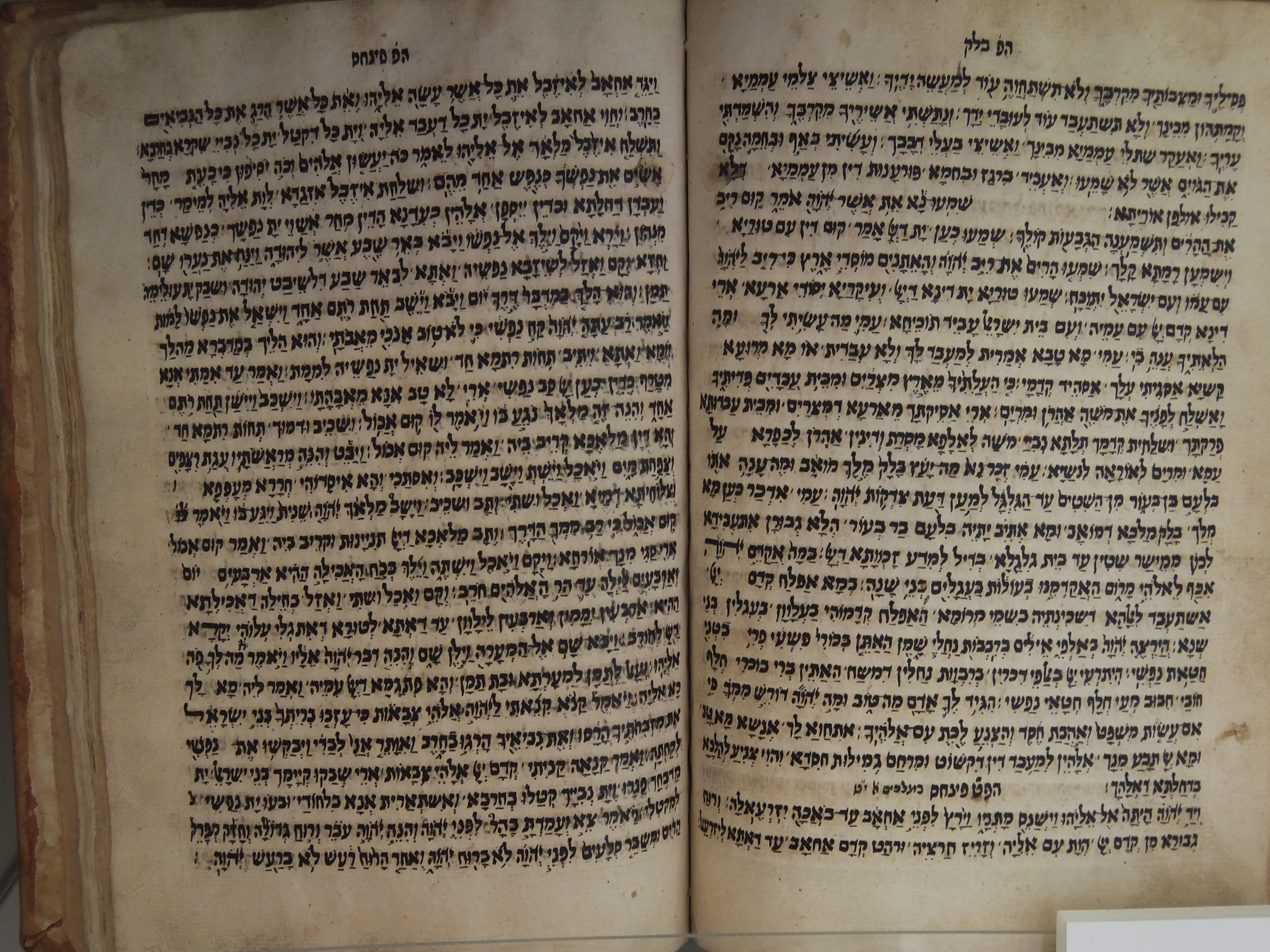
Sefer Haftara written in Yemen (ca. 19th century) A section from Micah 6

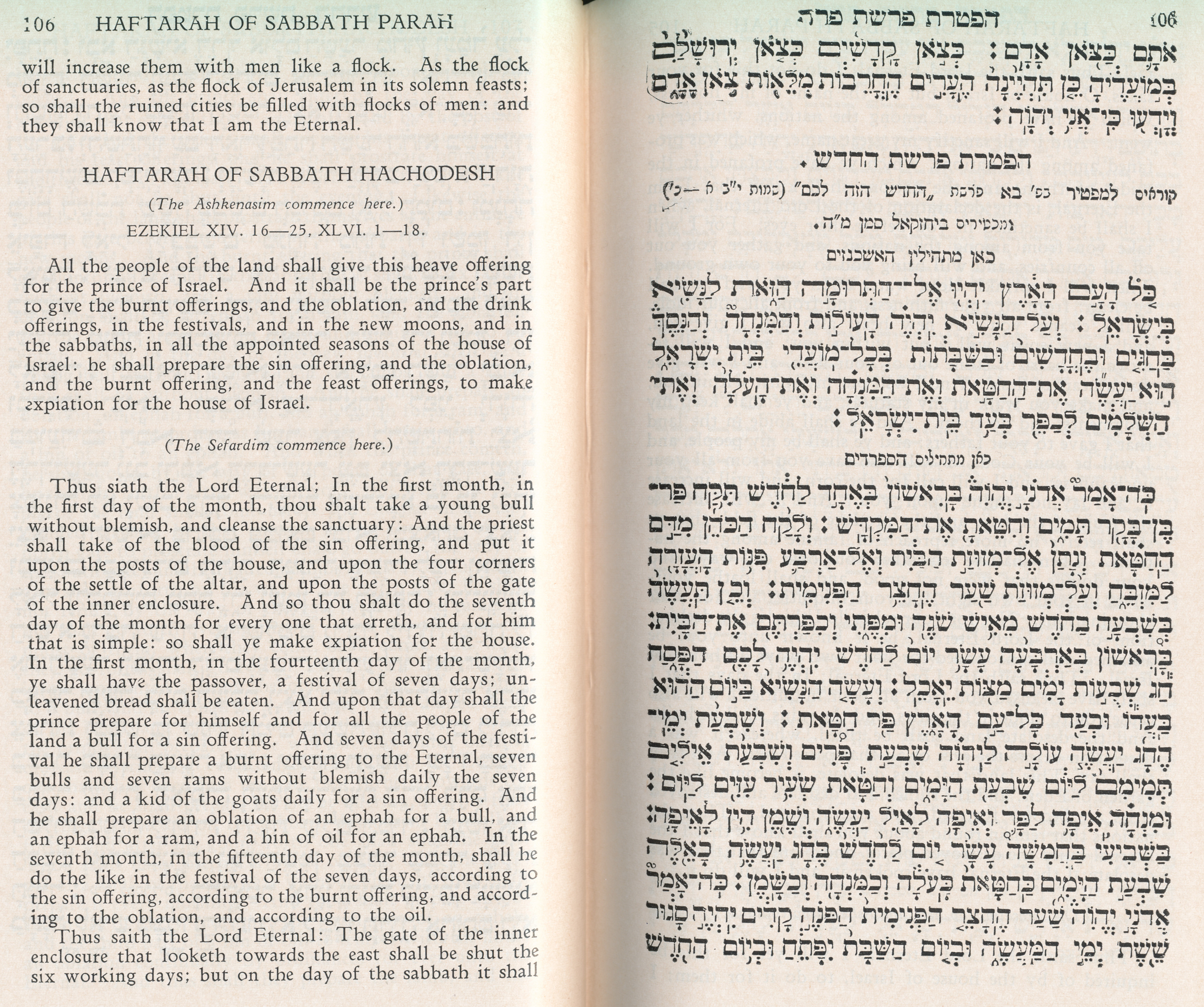
Diglot Hebrew-English Haftara sample, showing how Sephardic and Ashkenazi traditions differ in their section boundaries

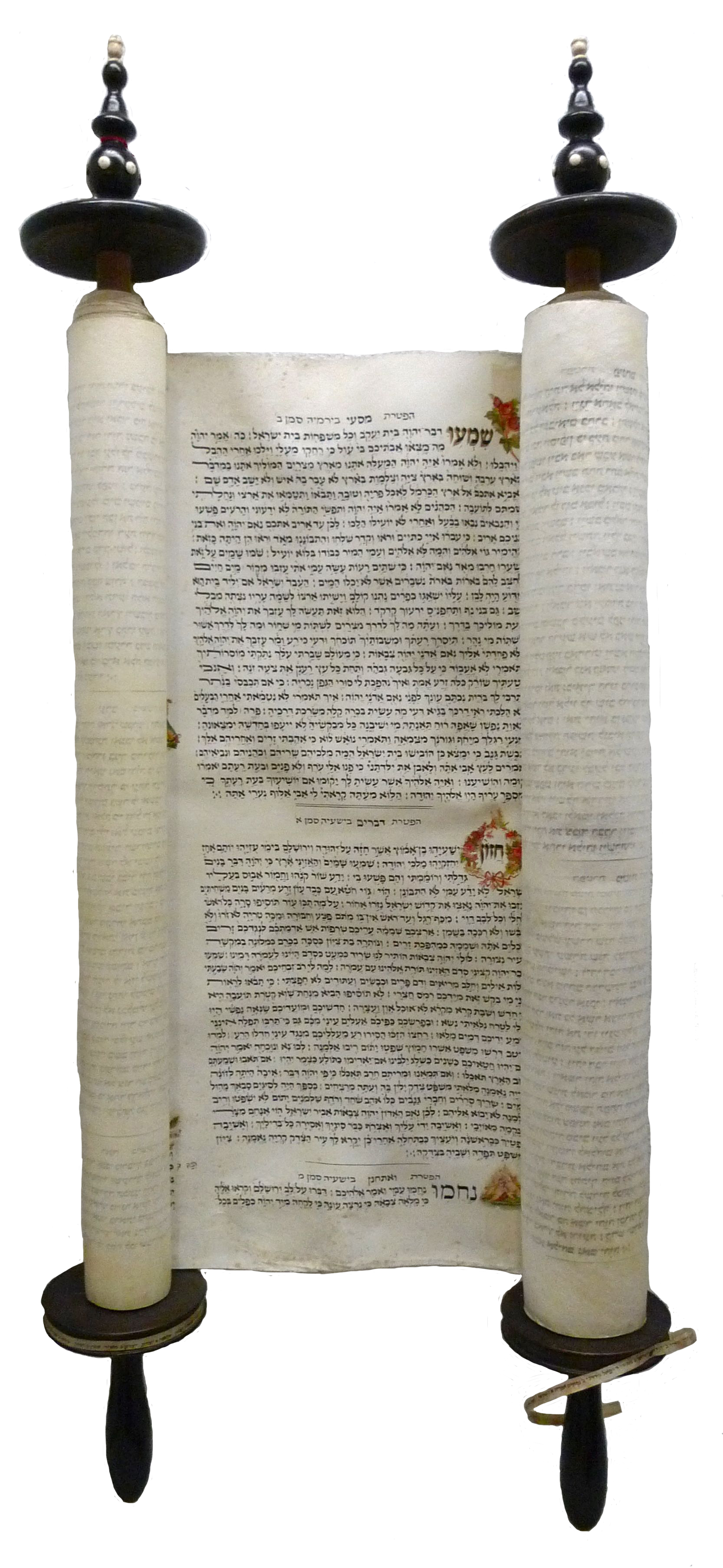
Haftara scroll from Obernai, Alsace, 1867, in the collection of the Jewish Museum of Switzerland.

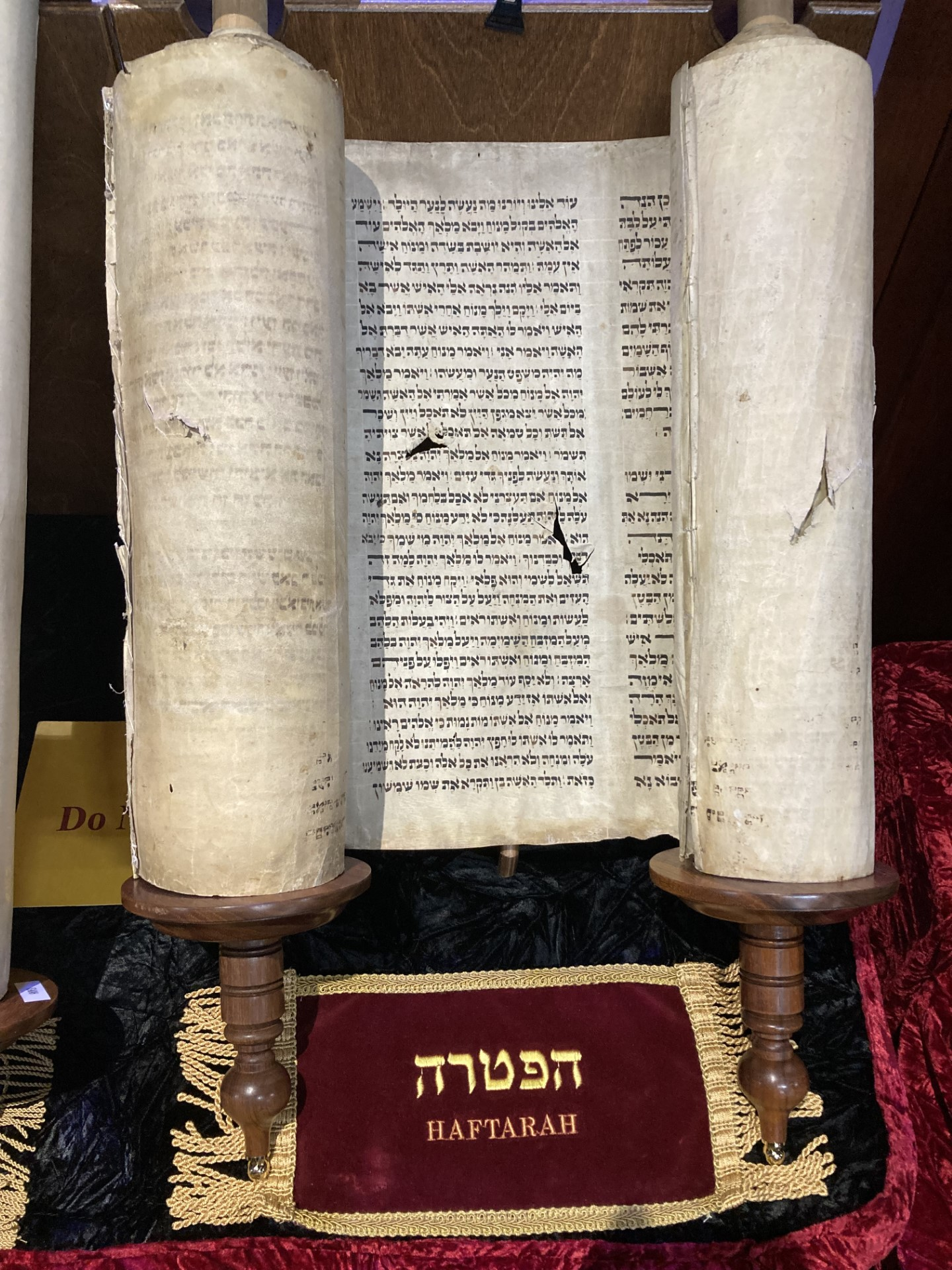
Haftara scroll from Poland, holes believed to be from Nazi bayonets

The haftara or (in Ashkenazic pronunciation) haftorah (alt. haftarah, haphtara, Hebrew: הפטרה) "parting," "taking leave" (plural form: haftarot or haftoros), is a series of selections from the books of Nevi'im ("Prophets") of the Hebrew Bible (Tanakh) that is publicly read in synagogue as part of Jewish religious practice. The haftara reading follows the Torah reading on each Sabbath and on Jewish festivals and fast days. Typically, the haftara is thematically linked to the parashah (weekly Torah portion) that precedes it. The haftara is sung in a chant. (Chanting of Biblical texts is known as "ta'amim" in Hebrew, "trope" in Yiddish, or "cantillation" in English.) Related blessings precede and follow the haftara reading.

The origin of haftara reading is lost to history, and several theories have been proposed to explain its role in Jewish practice, suggesting it arose in response to the persecution of the Jews under Antiochus IV Epiphanes which preceded the Maccabean Revolt, wherein Torah reading was prohibited, or that it was "instituted against the Samaritans, who denied the canonicity of the Prophets (except for Joshua), and later against the Sadducees." Another theory is that it was instituted after some act of persecution or other disaster in which the synagogue Torah scrolls were destroyed or ruined, as it was forbidden to read the Torah portion from any but a ritually fit parchment scroll, but there was no such requirement about a reading from Prophets, which was then "substituted as a temporary expedient and then remained." The Talmud mentions that a haftara was read in the presence of Rabbi Eliezer ben Hurcanus, who lived c. 70 CE, and that by the time of Rabbah bar Nahmani (the 3rd century) there was a "Scroll of Haftarot", which is not further described. Several references in the Christian New Testament suggest this Jewish custom was in place during that era.

== History ==
No one knows for certain the origins of reading the haftara, but several theories have been put forth. The most common explanation, accepted by some traditional Jewish authorities is that in 168 BCE, when the Jews were under the rule of the Seleucid king Antiochus IV Epiphanes, they were forbidden to read the Torah and made do with a substitute. When they were again able to read the Torah, they kept reading the haftara as well. However, this theory was not articulated before the 14th century, when it was suggested by Rabbi David Abudirham, and has several weaknesses.

An alternative explanation, offered by Rabbis Reuven Margolies and Samson Raphael Hirsch (except where otherwise identified, this is the Hirsch cited throughout this article), is that the haftara reading was instituted to fight the influence of those sects in Judaism that viewed the Hebrew Bible as consisting only of the Torah.

However, all offered explanations for the origin of reading the haftara have unanswered difficulties.

Certainly the haftara was read — perhaps not obligatorily nor in all communities nor on every Sabbath — as far back as circa 70 CE: The Talmud mentions that a haftara was read in the presence of Rabbi Eliezer ben Hyrcanus, who lived at that time. The Christian Bible indicates that readings from the Prophets - but not necessarily a fixed schedule - was a common part of the Sabbath service in Jerusalem synagogues even earlier than 70 CE.

== Who reads the haftara ==
Only one person reads the haftara portion. This differs from the procedure in Torah reading, wherein the text is divided into anywhere from three to seven portions, which may be read by one person or divided amongst several.

The haftara is traditionally read by the maftir, or the last person to be called up to the Torah scroll.

Traditions varied or evolved with regard to which person could read the haftara. As an indication that, perhaps to make clear that the haftara reading was not the same status as the Torah reading, a minor (i.e., a boy not yet bar mitzvah age) was permitted to chant the haftara (at least on an ordinary Sabbath), and there were even communities where the haftara reading was reserved exclusively for minor boys. In recent centuries, Ashkenazi bar mitzvah boys, (now an adult) will read at least the maftir portion and the haftara. In some other communities, the haftara could only be read by one who had participated in the Torah reading (in some practices, the maftir - the last man to have read from the Torah), or even the whole congregation would read the haftara to themselves from the available humashim - this evidently to avoid embarrassing a reader who might make a mistake.

Rabbi Yosef Karo (16th century) reported that for many years there were no set haftarot: the maftir chose an appropriate passage from the Nevi'im. Over time, certain choices became established in certain communities; in contemporary Jewish observance one may not choose his own haftara, explained Rabbi Moshe Feinstein, as that would run against accepted custom. Rabbi Karo's explanation, however, helps to explain why communities have varying customs regarding what to read as haftara.

== What form of the text is read ==
Unlike the Torah portion, the haftara is, nowadays, normally read from a printed book. This may be either a Tanakh (entire Hebrew Bible), a Chumash (or "Humash"; plural: Chumashim)) (volume containing the Torah with haftarot) or, in the case of the festivals, the prayer book; there are also books containing the haftarot alone in large print. Even when a scroll of haftara readings is used, that scroll - unlike the Torah scroll - is occasionally made of paper and may include such embellishments as the vowel points and trope.

However, according to most halakhic decisors (posqim), it is preferable to read the haftara out of a parchment scroll, and according to a small minority of posqim (mainly the followers of the Vilna Gaon), such a parchment scroll is an absolute requirement. This may take various forms.

- According to some older traditions, the haftarot were read out of a special scroll containing just the selections of the Prophetic Books which were used in actual haftarot; this was known as a Sifra De'aftarta (ספרא דאפטרתא), and can still be found in a few communities today, both Ashkenazic and Sephardic; in some communities the scroll is made of paper. These scrolls sometimes contain vowel points and te`amim (cantillation signs), and sometimes do not.
- However, the Vilna Gaon instituted that haftarot be read only from scrolls which contained the full text of a Prophetic Book (e.g., full text of Joshua, or full text of Judges, or full text of Isaiah), just as a Torah scroll contains the full text of the Pentateuch. These scrolls are written in accordance with the laws of writing Torah scrolls, and thus - in the opinion of the Vilna Gaon - do not contain vowel points or cantillation signs. Such scrolls are used for the reading of the haftarot in many, perhaps most, Lithuanian-style yeshivot, and in a number of Ashkenazic synagogues, especially in Israel. Some say that if such a scroll is unavailable the entire congregation must read the haftara for themselves, silently or in a murmur, from books rather than the maftir reciting aloud from something other than a scroll.

It would seem that the initial resistance to using a printed book has diminished as the technology of printing, and therefore the accuracy and characteristics of the printed books, has improved. There were opinions that a haftara scroll should not be stored in the holy ark, but other opinions (such as Rabbi Ovadiah Yosef) were that it was permitted; however the haftara scroll is not decorated in the manner of the Torah scrolls but may be given distinctive (and inferior, such as copper) decorations.

== Blessings ==
Blessings both precede and follow the haftara reading. One reason the reading of the haftara is a special honor is because of the voluminous blessings that accompany the reading. These blessings are derived from the minor (and uncanonical) Talmudic tractate Massekhet Soferim - also called, simply, Soferim, which dates back to the 7th or 8th century CE. But it is possible that these blessings, or at least some of them, date from before the destruction of the Second Temple in 70 CE. At least some haftara blessings were in use by the second century. The blessings are read by the person designated to read the haftara portion; the blessing before the haftara is read in the tune of the haftara. The Sephardic practice is to recite, immediately after the text of the haftara and before the concluding blessings, the verse of Isaiah 47:4 ("Our Redeemer! The Lord of Hosts is his name, the Holy Lord of Israel!"). The blessings following the haftara are standard on all occasions the haftara is read, except for the final blessing, which varies by date and is omitted on some days.

There are five blessings, one before, and the others after, the haftara reading. These blessings may go back as far as the haftara ritual itself. It will be immediately noticed that the haftara has more, and longer, blessings than the reading of the Torah itself; it is plausible that the reading from the Prophets was given this distinction in order to emphasize the sacred nature of the Prophetic books in the face of Samaritan rejection. If the haftara is read by the maftir, then he had already recited two blessings for the Torah reading and the five haftara blessings means he has recited a total of the significant number of seven blessings. The first blessing is not recited until the Torah scroll has been rolled shut, so that the roller may listen without distraction. And, similarly, the haftara text itself - whether a book or a scroll - remains open on the lectern until after the final haftara blessing is concluded. The blessings have changed but only a little over the centuries, the current text apparently coming from the late 11th century Machzor Vitry, with slight differences from the texts perpetuated in the tractate Massekhet Soferim (possibly 7th or 8th century), and the writings of Maimonides, dating back to the 12th century.

The first blessing, chanted before the haftara portion read, uses the same melody as the haftara chant itself, also in minor mode. For this reason, many prayerbooks print this first blessing with the cantillation marks used in the Bible itself for the books of the Prophets, possibly the only instance of a non-biblical text to be equipped with such marks. This initial blessing is only two verses, but both begin with blessing God, yet are not interrupted by an intervening Amen.

The blessings are as follows: The first blessing precedes the reading:

Blessed are you, Lord [YHVH], our God, King of the universe,
Who has chosen good prophets,
And was pleased with their words spoken in truth.

Blessed are you, Lord, who has chosen the Torah, and his servant Moses,
And his people Israel,
And the prophets of truth and righteousness.
[congregation: Amen.]

This is a somewhat free translation from the poetic Hebrew text which is roughly the same in both Ashkenazic and Sephardic prayerbooks. The blessing is printed in one paragraph and read continuously by the cantillist with only an etnachta between sentences. The first blessing is straight from the minor tractate Massekhet Soferim, chapter 13, paragraph 7. The first verse praises God, "who has chosen good prophets" (presumably distinguished from false prophets not called by God), the second verse is one of the few places in the Sabbath liturgy that mentions Moses, also chosen by God as were the prophets. "Pleased with their words" because, while Moses wrote the Torah of words dictated verbatim by God, the prophets were each speaking their own words, which won Divine approval after they were spoken. In this context, 'Israel' means world Jewry wherever they may be.

Immediately after the last word of the haftara has been read, many Sefardic, Mizrahi, and Italic congregations traditionally recite two Bible verses, which are then repeated by the maftir:

Our Redeemer - the Lord of Hosts is his name - the holy one of Israel.
Blessed be the Lord forever. Amen and Amen.

The blessings that follow the reading of the haftara are chanted in the pentatonic scale.

The second blessing follows the end of the Prophetic reading:

Blessed are you, Lord, our God, King of the universe,
Rock of all the worlds, righteous through all eras,
The trustworthy God, who says and does, who speaks and fulfills,
For all his words are true and just.

Trustworthy are you, Lord, and trustworthy are your words,
And not a single one of your words is recalled as unfulfilled,
Because you are God, king, trustworthy.
Blessed are you Lord, the God who is trustworthy in all his words.
[congregation: Amen.]

Again, this is straight from Massekhet Soferim, paragraphs 8 and 10; Paragraph 9 set out a congregational response which seems not to have been adopted; after the first verse the congregation would rise and say "Faithful are you Lord our God, and trustworthy are your words. O faithful, living, and enduring, may you constantly rule over us forever and ever." This response apparently was in use in antiquity - the Jews of the eastern diaspora would recite this while seated, the Jews of Eretz Yisrael would stand. This practice appears to have ceased during the Middle Ages: it is not in Amram's prayerbook of the 9th century although a phrase of it ["Trustworthy are you Lord our God, living and enduring forever", right after "words are true and just"] is in the Mahzor Vitry , (ca. 1100), but in the 18th century Rabbi Jacob Emden criticized its omission. The second half of the blessing echoes Isaiah 45:23 and 55:11.

The third blessing follows immediately:

Be merciful to Zion, because it is the home of our life,
And save the downtrodden soon, in our own days.
Blessed are you Lord, who makes glad the children of Zion [or: makes Zion to rejoice in her children].
[congregation: Amen.]

Very similar to Massekhet Soferim, paragraph 11, which begins "Comfort [Nahem, instead of rahem ], Lord our God, Zion your city..." and ends "who comforts the children of Zion." Zion means Mount Zion, the hill in Jerusalem on which the Temple stood, although it had been destroyed centuries before this blessing was composed. It is possible that Mount Zion is mentioned formerly to deliberately refute the Samaritans, who centered their devotion to Mount Gerizim instead of Mount Zion. Instead of "save" (toshiya) the downtrodden, Massekhet Soferim has "avenge" (tenikum), which is used in the Yemenite version of the blessing. By the time of Amram Gaon (9th century) and Saadiah Gaon (10th century), as well as Mahzor Vitry (ca. 1100), 'be merciful' had replaced 'comfort' - but 'avenge' was still part of the text—and into the last century was still part of both Romaniot and Yemenite versions. It has been suggested that "save" replaced "avenge" in so many communities because of Christian and Moslem censorship or intimidation.

The fourth blessing follows immediately:

Make us glad, Lord our God,
with the Prophet Elijah, your servant,
and with the kingdom of the house of David, your anointed,
May he arrive soon and bring joy to our hearts.
Let no stranger sit upon his throne,
Nor let others continue to usurp his glory.
For you swore by your holy name that through all eternity his lamp will never go dark.
Blessed are you Lord, shield of David.
[congregation: Amen.]

This is virtually identical to the text in Massekhet Soferim, paragraph 12, until the last line. Before the second "Blessed are you", Soferim contains the line: "And in his days may Judah be made safe, and Israel to dwell securely, and he shall be called, 'the Lord is our vindicator'." This line remained in Romaniot liturgy. Instead of "Shield of David", Soferim has "who brings to fruition the mighty salvation of his people Israel." But by the 3rd century, "shield of David" was the text in use, predating Soferim. "He" and "his" refer to the Messiah, a descendant of King David. The lines "let no stranger sit on his throne" and "others continue to usurp his glory" might date back to the earliest Talmudic times, when the Hasmoneans and Herodians, rather than true descendants of the royal house of David, were rulers of the Holy Land.

The fifth (final) blessing follows immediately:

For the Torah reading, and for the worship service, and for [the reading from] the Prophets,
And for this Sabbath day [or: for this (holiday)], which you have given us, Lord our God,
For holiness and for respite, for honor and for splendor,
For all of this, Lord our God,
We gratefully thank you, and bless you.
May your name be blessed by every living mouth,
Always and forever.
Blessed are you Lord, who sanctifies the Sabbath.
[congregation: Amen.]

This is from paragraph 13 of Soferim, which does not contain the phrase "by every living mouth", and which concludes with "who sanctifies Israel and the Day of [holiday name]." Amram Gaon and Maimonides concluded with "who rebuilds Jerusalem," but this appears to have been discarded by all factions. This final blessing is modified for the various festivals and holidays. In all traditions that last phrase, "who sanctifies the Sabbath", is replaced by the appropriate substitute when the occasion is something other than an ordinary Sabbath, if a holiday falling on a Sabbath the phrasing is "And for this Sabbath day and for this day of this...." (if not on a Sabbath, then merely "and for this day of ..."); e.g. (for Passover) "Festival of Matzos", (on Shavuos) "Festival of Shavuos", (on Succos) "Festival of Succos, (on Shemini Atzeres or Simhas Torah) "Festival of the Assembly", (on Rosh Hashana) "Day of Remembrance", (on Yom Kippur) "Day of Atonement", - but it appears from Kol Bo (14th century) that Yom Kippur is the only fast day with a name and therefore this final blessing is not recited at all on other fast days, such as Gedaliah or Esther or Tisha B'Av, since they have no such names that can be inserted into the blessing - and then the festival version of the blessing concludes:

"... which you have given us, Lord our God, [(on Sabbaths) for holiness and respite,]
for gladness and joy [on Yom Kippur this is replaced with: for pardon, forgiveness, and atonement],
for honor and splendor.
For all this Lord our God we thank you and praise you.
May your name be blessed by every living mouth, always and forever.
Blessed are you Lord, who sanctifies [the Sabbath and] Israel and the Festivals."

And on Yom Kippur, replace the last line with :

Blessed are you Lord,
the King who pardons and forgives our sins and the sins of his people, the family of Israel,
and who removes our iniquities year after year,
King over all the earth, who sanctifies [the Sabbath,] Israel, and the Day of Atonement.

== Customs ==
In ancient times the haftara, like the Torah, was translated into Aramaic as it was read, and this is still done by Yemenite Jews. The Talmud rules that, while the Torah must be translated verse by verse, it is permissible to translate other readings (such as the Haftara) in units of up to three verses at a time.

Haftarot must have something in common with the day. On an ordinary Sabbath, this would mean that they have something in common with the Torah reading. However, the connection can be quite vague; the relevance for the parashah Bamidbar (addressing a census of Israel) is that the haftorah beginning that the people of Israel will be numerous like the sand of the sea.

The Talmud also says that the haftara should be at least 21 verses in length, to match the minimal Torah reading, but if the "topic finished" (salik inyana) applies this requirement is not necessary. Thus, the haftara for Ki Teitzei for Ashkenazim and Sephardim is only 10 verses; and the haftara for Miketz is, for Ashkenazim and Sephardim only 15 verses, and for Italian Jews only 14 verses. The Tosefta mentions a haftara in antiquity (before the 2nd century CE) that was just one verse, namely Isaiah 52:3, and some others that were only four or five verses.

Another rule is that the haftara reading should not end on a macabre or distressing verse, and therefore either the penultimate verse is repeated at the very end or else verses from elsewhere are used as a coda, such as with the haftara for Tzav (Ashkenazim and Sephardim skip ahead in the same prophet to avoid concluding with the description of the dire fate of the wicked, a total of 19 verses; Chabad and Yemenite also skip ahead to avoid concluding with a different disquieting verse, a total of 16 verses; Karaites and Romaniote go back and repeat the penultimate verse, promising the reappearance of Elijah, rather than end with the word "desolation" - and the same applies when most communities read that haftarah on Shabbat Hagadol ). Among the consistent characteristics is that entire verses are read; never is only a part of a verse read.

In antiquity there was no prescribed list of haftara readings for the year, although the Talmudic literature (including the Midrash and Tosefta) does report some recommendations for specific holidays. It would appear that, in antiquity, the choice of portion from the Prophets was made ad hoc, without regard for the choice of previous years or of other congregations, either by the reader or by the congregation or its leaders; this is evidenced by recommendations in Talmudic literature that certain passages should not be chosen for haftara readings, which indicates that, to that time, that a regular list for the year's readings did not exist. Further evidence of the lack of an ancient authoritative list of readings is the simple fact that, while the practice of reading a haftara every Sabbath and most holy days is ubiquitous, the different traditions and communities around the world have by now adopted differing lists, indicating that no solid tradition from antiquity dictated the haftara selections for a majority of the ordinary Sabbaths.

== Cantillation ==
The haftara is read with cantillation according to a unique melody (not with the same cantillation melody as the Torah). The tradition to read Nevi'im with its own special melody is attested to in late medieval sources, both Ashkenazic and Sephardic. A medieval Sephardic source notes that the melody for the haftarot is a slight variation of the tune used for reading the books of Nevi'im in general (presumably for study purposes), and Jews of Iraqi origin to this day preserve separate "Neviim" and "Haftara" melodies.

Note that although many selections from Nevi'im are read as haftarot over the course of the year, the books of Nevi'im are not read in their entirety (as opposed to the Torah). Since Nevi'im as a whole is not covered in the liturgy, the melodies for certain rare cantillation notes which appear in the books of Nevi'im but not in the haftarot have been forgotten. For more on this, see Nevi'im.

As a generality, although the Torah was chanted in a major key (ending in a minor key), the haftara is chanted in a minor key (as is the blessing before the reading of the haftara) and ends in a pentatonic mode (and the blessings following the haftara reading are also pentatonic).

The Haftarot for the morning of Tisha b'Av, and for the Shabbat preceding it, are, in many synagogues, predominantly read to the cantillation melody used for the public reading of the Book of Lamentations, or Eicha. In the German tradition, the Haftara for the morning of Tisha b'Av, as well as the Torah reading then, are read without cantillation at all, but rather with a melancholic melody.

Leonard Bernstein employed the Haftara cantillation melody extensively as a theme in the second movement ("Profanation") of his Symphony No. 1 ("Jeremiah").

== On Sabbath afternoon ==
Some Rishonim, including Rabbenu Tam, report that a custom in the era of the Talmud was to read a haftara at the mincha service each Sabbath afternoon — but that this haftara was from the Ketuvim rather than from the Nevi'im. Most halachic authorities maintain that that was not the custom in Talmudic times, and that such a custom should not be followed. In the era of the Geonim, some communities, including some in Persia, read a passage from Nevi'im (whether or not in the form of a haftara) Sabbath afternoons. Although this practice is virtually defunct, most halachic authorities maintain that there is nothing wrong with it.

Rabbi Reuven Margolies claims that the now-widespread custom of individuals' reciting Psalm 111 after the Torah reading Sabbath afternoon derives from the custom reported by Rabbenu Tam. Louis Ginzberg makes the analogous claim for the custom of reciting Psalm 91 in Motza'ei Shabbat.

== As a B'nai Mitzvah ritual ==
In many communities the haftara is read by a Bar Mitzvah or Bat Mitzvah at his or her respective ceremonies, along with some, all, or, sometimes none of the Torah portion. This is often referred to, mainly in Hebrew schools and bar preparatory programs, as a haftara portion.

The reading of the haftara by the Bar Mitzvah is a relatively new custom, since it is not derived from either Bible nor Talmud. According to the Talmud, the lesson from the Prophets may be read by a minor (i.e., a boy younger than 13), if he is sufficiently educated to do it. A tradition that might have dated back to medieval times was that a boy would read the haftara on the Sabbath prior to his Bar Mitzvah, and on the day of his Bar Mitzvah read the portion from the Torah but not the haftara; this custom changed, in the United States, in the late 19th century or early 20th century, when the Bar Mitzvah would read both the Torah and haftara on the Sabbath immediately following his 13th birthday. The custom of the Bar Mitzvah reading the haftara is so recent that the appropriate procedure for a haftara reading when two boys are Bar Mitzvah on the same day is still unresolved.

== List of Haftarot ==
The selections of haftarot readings for the various weeks and holy days of the year differs from tradition to tradition - Ashkenazic from Sefardic from Yemenite from Mizrachi, etc. And even within a tradition there is no one authoritative list, but a multitude of different lists from different communities and congregations, usually differing from each other by only one or two haftarot. A study of the antiquity of each of these lists, and how they differ from each other, is beyond the scope of this (or any other brief) article but may be most informative on the history (including the contacts and separations) of the various communities. The list compiled by Rabbi Eli Duker contains many historical customs that did not survive until the present day.

The selection from Nevi'im [the Prophets] read as the haftara is not always the same in all Jewish communities. When customs differ, this list indicates them as follows: A=Ashkenazic custom (AF=Frankfurt am Main; AH=Chabad; AP= Poland; APZ = Posen;); I=Italian custom; S=Sephardic and Mizrahi custom (SM=Maghreb [North Africa]; SZ= Mizrahi [Middle and Far East]); Y=Yemenite custom; R=Romaniote (Byzantine, eastern Roman empire, extinct) custom; and K=Karaite custom. In several instances, authorities did not agree on the readings of various communities.

Because, in the Diaspora, certain holy days and festivals are observed for an additional day, which day is not so observed in Eretz Yisrael, sometimes different haftarot are read simultaneously inside and outside Eretz Yisrael. On the converse, it is possible for a different Torah portion to be read in Israel and the Diaspora, but the same Haftarah.

=== Genesis ===
==== Bereshit (1:1–6:8) ====
- A: Isaiah 42:5–43:10
- S, AF, AH, AP, APZ: Isaiah 42:5–21
- Portuguese (acc to Dotan, Lyons): Isaiah 42:5–21, and 61:10, and 62:5
- I: Isaiah 42:1–21
- Y: Isaiah 42:1–16
- R: Isaiah 65:16–66:11
- K: Isaiah 65:17–66:13

==== Noach (6:9–11:32) ====
- A, Y, I, SM: Isaiah 54:1-55:5
- some Y communities: Isaiah 54:1–55:3
- S, AF, AH: Isaiah 54:1–10
- K, R: Isaiah 54:9–55:12

==== Lech-Lecha (12:1–17:27) ====
- A, S: Isaiah 40:27–41:16
- Y, I: Isaiah 40:25-41:17
- R: Joshua 24:3–23
- K: Joshua 24:3–18

==== Vayeira (18:1–22:24) ====
- A, Y, AH, I, Algiers: Second Kings 4:1-37
- S, AF, AP, APZ: Second Kings 4:1–23
- R: Isaiah 33:17–34:13
- K: Isaiah 33:17–35:12 and verse 35:10

==== Chayei Sarah (23:1–25:18) ====
- A, S, Y, Dardaim communities: First Kings 1:1–31 (some Y add at end First Kings 1:46)
- I: First Kings 1:1-34
- K, R: Isaiah 51:2–22

==== Toledot (25:19–28:9) ====
- A, S, I: Malachi 1:1-2:7
- Y: Malachi 1:1–3:4
- K, R: Isaiah 65:23–66:18

==== Vayetze (28:10–32:3) ====
(S.R. Hirsch notes that there are conflicting traditions about Vayetze; what follows is as given in Hirsch, Hertz, Jerusalem Crown, & the Koren Bibles)

- A: Hosea 12:13–14:10 (and some, including the Perushim, add at end Joel 2:26-27)
- some A (acc Dotan): Hosea 12:13-14:10 and Micah 7:18-20; some other A (acc to Dotan) Hosea 12:13-14:7
- S (also A, acc Cassuto, Harkavy, IDF): Hosea 11:7-12:12
- K, Amsterdam, Algiers, some SM (and S, acc to ArtScroll): Hosea 11:7-13:5
- Y, I, Baghdad, Djerba (Tunisia), (and AH, acc to Cassuto): Hosea 11:7-12:14
- AH (acc to Hirsch): Hosea 11:7-12:12;
- R: Hosea 12:13–14:3

==== Vayishlach (32:4–36:43) ====
(See Vayetze above.)

- A (acc to many authorities, including Hertz) (a few A, acc to Dotan; "some" A, acc to Hirsch): Hosea 11:7–12:12
- S, Y, I, R, K, AH (and many A, acc to Dotan, Lyons) (both A & S, acc to Hirsch, SJC, & Benisch): Obadiah 1:1-21 (entire book).
- A (acc to Cassuto): Hosea 12:13-14:9; (acc to Harkavy) Hosea 12:13-14:10

==== Vayeshev (37:1–40:23) ====
- A, S, Y, I: Amos 2:6–3:8
- R: Isaiah 32:18–33:18
- K: Isaiah 32:18–33:22

(° However, if Vayeshev occurs during Hanukkah, which occurs when the preceding Rosh Hashanah coincided with the Sabbath, the haftara is Zechariah 2:14–4:7.)

==== Miketz (41:1–44:17) ====
- A, S: First Kings 3:15-4:1 °

(° This haftara may be the most rarely read; it is only read when the preceding Rosh Hashanah coincided with the Sabbath and Cheshvan and Kislev both had 29 days - e.g. the winters of 1996, 2000, 2020, 2023, 2040, 2047, 2067, 2070, 2074, 2094, 2098, etc. - because this Sabbath is usually the first, sometimes the second, Sabbath in Hanukkah, in which case a specific holiday haftara is substituted.)

- I: First Kings 3:15-28
- R: Isaiah 29:7-30:4
- K: Isaiah 29:7-24

==== Vayigash (44:18–47:27) ====
- A, S, I: Ezekiel 37:15-28
- R: Joshua 14:6-15:6
- K: Joshua 14:6-14:15

==== Vayechi (47:28–50:26) ====
- A, S, I: First Kings 2:1-12
- K, R: Second Kings 13:14–14:7

=== Exodus ===
==== Shemot (1:1–6:8) ====
- A, (acc to Dotan, Harkavy) some S: Isaiah 27:6–28:13 & 29:22–23
- K, R: Isaiah 27:6–28:13
- S, I: Jeremiah 1:1-2:3
- Y (also Algiers, Baghdad, Fez [in Morocco], Persia): Ezekiel 16:1–14 (acc to Dotan, 16:1–13)

==== Va'eira (6:2–9:35) ====
- A, S, and I (acc to Hebrew Wikipedia): Ezekiel 28:25–29:21
- APZ: Ezekiel 29:1–29:21
- Y, (acc to Cassuto) I: Ezekiel 28:24-29:21
- K, R: Isaiah 42:8–43:5

==== Bo (10:1–13:16) ====
- A, S: Jeremiah 46:13–28
- SM, Algiers, Fez, (acc to Hebrew Wikipedia) Y: Isaiah 19:1–19:25
- I, Baghdad, (acc Cassuto) Y: Isaiah 18:7–19:25
- R: Isaiah 34:11–36:4
- K: Isaiah 34:11–35:10

==== Beshalach (13:17–17:16) ====
(also called Shabbat Shirah)

- A, AH: Judges 4:4-5:31 (longest Haftara of the weekly readings)
- Y, Libya, Fez, Istanbul: Judges 4:23–5:31
- I, (some A, acc to Hebrew Wikipedia): Judges 4:4–5:3
- some A (acc to Benisch notes in English, Harkavy) Judges 4:4-24
- S: Judges 5:1–5:31; (acc to Harkavy) Judges 5:1–5:28
- K, R: Joshua 24:7–24:26

==== Yitro (18:1–20:26) ====
- A, I, Baghdad, Algiers: Isaiah 6:1-7:6 & 9:5-6
- S, AH, APZ, some I: Isaiah 6:1-13
- Y: Isaiah 6:1-6:13 & 9:5-6
- R: Isaiah 33:13–34:10
- K: Isaiah 33:13–34:8

==== Mishpatim (21:1–24:18) ====
(In most years, the Sabbath of Mishpatim is also the Sabbath of Parashat Shekalim, Rosh Chodesh Adar I, or Erev Rosh Chodesh Adar I. It is only read in non-leap years when the preceding Rosh Hashanah was a Thursday and the following Passover is a Sunday, in leap years when the preceding Rosh Hashanah was a Thursday or in leap years when the following Passover coincides with the Sabbath.)

- A, S, some I: Jeremiah 34:8-22 & 33:25-26
- Y: Jeremiah 34:8–35:19
- I: Jeremiah 34:8–35:11
- R: Isaiah 56:1–57:10
- K: Isaiah 56:1–57:2&

==== Terumah (25:1–27:19) ====
(In most years, the haftara of Terumah is read. It is only substituted in non-leap years when the preceding Rosh Hashanah was a Thursday and the following Passover is a Sunday or in leap years when the preceding Rosh Hashanah was a Thursday and the following Passover is a Tuesday.)

- A, S, I, Y: First Kings 5:26-6:13
- R: Isaiah 60:17–62:3
- K: Isaiah 60:17–61:9

==== Tetzaveh (27:20–30:10) ====
- A, S, I, Y: Ezekiel 43:10-27
- K, R: Jeremiah 11:16–12:15

==== Ki Tissa (30:11-34:35) ====
- A: First Kings 18:1-39
- S, AH, AF, AP, APZ, (& I, acc to Harkavy, Cassuto, and Hebrew Wikipedia): First Kings 18:20-39
- I: First Kings 18:1-38
- Y: First Kings 18:1-46
- R: Isaiah 43:7–44:2
- K: Isaiah 43:7–44:5

==== Vayakhel (35:1-38:20) ====
(This haftara is very seldom read. It is only read in leap years when the preceding Rosh Hashanah was a Thursday — e.g., in 2005, 2008, 2011, 2014, 2033, 2035, 2038, 2052, 2062 — because this Sabbath is often combined with that of Pekudei and very often is also the Sabbath of Shekalim or of Parah or of HaChodesh, in which case another haftara is substituted.)

- A: First Kings 7:40–50 (AF ends at 8:1) (this is the S haftara for Pekudei, next week)
- S, AH, I: First Kings 7:13-26 (in Sephardic practice, this haftara is very rarely read)
- Y: First Kings 7:13–22
- R: First Kings 8:1–8:10
- K: First Kings 8:1–8:19

==== Pekudei (38:21–40:38) ====
(In most years this haftara is not read because it falls on the Sabbath of Parashat HaHodesh, or, less often, Parashat Shekalim. It is only read in leap years when the preceding Rosh Hashanah was not a Thursday.)

- A, AH: First Kings 7:51–8:21
- APZ: First Kings 8:1–8:21
- S, Y, Baghdad, I: First Kings 7:40–50 (acc to Cassuto, I end with verse 51)
- AF: First Kings 7:40–8:1
- Perushim: First Kings 7:40–8:21
- I: First Kings 7:40-51
- R: First Kings 7:27–47
- K: Jeremiah 30:18–31:13

=== Leviticus ===
==== Vayikra (1:1–5:26) ====
- A, S, K: Isaiah 43:21–44:23
- Y, I, some SM: Isaiah 43:21–44:6
- R: Isaiah 43:21–44:13

==== Tzav (6:1–8:36) ====
(In non-leap years this Haftara is not read in most communities because it coincides with Shabbat HaGadol; or, during leap years, it is more often either the Sabbath of Parashat Zachor; the Sabbath of Parashat Parah; or, in Jerusalem, Shushan Purim. It is only read in leap years when the following Passover coincides with the Sabbath or, outside Jerusalem, when Passover is a Sunday. In German and Hungarian communities where the Haftara for Shabbat HaGadol is read only when Passover falls on Sunday, this Haftarah is read in most non-leap years.)

- A, S: Jeremiah 7:21–8:3; 9:22–23
- Y, AH: Jeremiah 7:21–28; 9:22–23
- I, Fez: Jeremiah 7:21–28; (acc to Hebrew Wikipedia) I. adds at end Jeremiah 10:6-7
- K, R: Malachi 3:4–3:24, & repeat 3:23

==== Shemini (9:1–11:47) ====
- A: Second Samuel 6:1–7:17
- S, AH, APZ: Second Samuel 6:1-19 (and some add 7:16–17)
- Y, I: Second Samuel 6:1–7:3
- R: Ezekiel 43:27–44:21
- K: Ezekiel 43:27–44:16

==== Tazria (12:1–13:59) ====
(In non-leap years, this parashah is combined with Metzora; or, during leap years, it is more often the Sabbath of Parashat HaChodesh. It is only read in leap years when the preceding and/or following Rosh Hashanah coincides with the Sabbath.)

- A, S, I, Y: Second Kings 4:42–5:19
- K, R: Isaiah 66:7–66:24, & repeat 66:23
- Tazria–Metzora
- Second Kings 7:3–20

==== Metzora (14:1–15:33) ====
- A, S, AH, R: Second Kings 7:3–20
- Y, I: Second Kings 7:1–20 & 13:23
- K: Second Kings 7:3-18

==== Acharei Mot (16:1-18:30) ====
(Both Hirsch and the ArtScroll humashim note that there is some confusion over the correct Haftara. In non-leap years, this parashah is combined with next, Kedoshim, so the two are seldom distinguished from each other:)

- A (acc to Hirsch, Dotan, & ArtScroll), AH: Amos 9:7-15
- A, S (acc to Hertz, Hirsch), Berlin, (and, acc to Hirsch, A in Israel): Ezekiel 22:1-19 °
- S, K, AF (and A, acc to Cassuto, Koren, IDF, Jerusalem Crown, Benisch, & Hebrew Wikipedia): Ezekiel 22:1-16 °
- R: Ezekiel 22:1-20

(° This reading contains verses disparaging the city of Jerusalem. It was therefore the practice of the Vilna Gaon, of Rabbi Joseph Soloveichik, and others, to read the haftara for the next parashah from Amos, even if this meant repeating the same Amos reading two weeks in a row.)

- Acharei Mot - Kedoshim
- A, AH: Amos 9:7-15 (this is contrary to the usual rule that when weekly portions must be combined, the second week's haftara is read)
- S, I: Ezekiel 20:2-20

==== Kedoshim (19:1-20:27) (again, some confusion) ====
- A (acc to ArtScroll): Ezekiel 22:1-16
- A (acc to Hirsch): Ezekiel 22:1-19
- A (acc to Cassuto, Hertz, IDF, Jerusalem Crown, Benische, Dotan, Koren, & Hebrew Wikipedia): Amos 9:7-15
- APZ: Ezekiel 22:2-16
- S, AH, Y, I (acc to Hirsch, and Benisch): Ezekiel 20:1-20
- S (acc to Cassuto, ArtScroll, Hertz, IDF, Jerusalem Crown, Koren, & Hebrew Wikipedia; and some S acc to Hirsch), some I: Ezekiel 20:2-20
- Y (acc to Hebrew Wikipedia): Ezekiel 20:1-15
- R: Isaiah 3:4-5:17
- K: Isaiah 4:3-5:16

==== Emor (21:1-24:23) ====
- A, S, Y, I: Ezekiel 44:15-31
- K, R: Ezekiel 44:25-45:11

==== Behar (25:1-26:2) ====
(In non-leap years [except in Eretz Yisrael when the following Shavuot is a Sunday], this parashah is combined with Bechukotai.)

- A, S: Jeremiah 32:6-27
- APZ: Jeremiah 32:6-32
- AH: Jeremiah 32:6-22
- Y, I: Jeremiah 16:19-17:14
- K, R: Isaiah 24:2–23
- Behar - Bechukotai (In non-leap years [except in Eretz Yisrael when the following Shavuot is a Sunday], the Torah portions for both parshiot are read with the haftara for Bechukotai.)
- A, S: Jeremiah 16:19–17:14

==== Bechukotai (26:3-27:34) ====
(In non-leap years [except in Eretz Yisrael when the following Shavuot is a Sunday], this parashah is combined with Behar.)

- A, S, AH: Jeremiah 16:19–17:14
- APZ: Ezekiel 34:1–15
- Y: Ezekiel 34:1–27
- I: Ezekiel 34:1–15
- AP: Ezekiel 34:1–31
- K, R, Iraq: Isaiah 1:19–2:11

=== Numbers ===
==== Bemidbar (1:1–4:20) ====
- Hosea 2:1–22

==== Naso (4:21–7:89) ====
- A, S, I: Judges 13:2–25
- R: Hosea 4:14–6:2
- Y, K: Judges 13:2–24

==== Behaalotecha (8:1–12:16) ====
(This haftara, in all traditions, includes Zechariah 3:2, which contains the very rarely used cantillation accent of mercha kefula, under zeh - "[is not] this [man a stick saved from fire?]".)

- A, S, I, R, K: Zechariah 2:14–4:7
- Y: Zechariah 2:14–4:9
- Libya: Zechariah 2:14–4:10

==== Shlach (13:1–15:41) ====
- A, S, I, Y: Joshua 2:1–24
- R: Joshua 2:1–21
- K: Joshua 2:1–15

==== Korach (16:1–18:32) ====
- A, S, Y: First Samuel 11:14–12:22
- R: Hosea 10:2–11:8
- K: Hosea 10:2–11:9

==== Chukat (19:1-22:1) ====
- A, S, I: Judges 11:1–33
- APZ: Judges 11:1–11
- Y: Judges 11:1–40
- R: Judges 11:1–21
- K: Judges 11:1–17
- Chukat - Balak (This only occurs in the Diaspora when the following 17 Tammuz is a Thursday.)
- Micah 5:6–6:8
- I: Micah 5:4–6:8

==== Balak (22:2–25:9) ====
- A, S, Y, R, K: Micah 5:6-6:8
- I: Micah 5:4-6:8

==== Pinchas (25:10-30:1), if on 14 Tammuz; 16 Tammuz; or, in Eretz Yisrael, 17 Tammuz ====
(In most years Pinchas falls after 17 Tammuz, and (except in the Italian rite) the haftara for Matot [see below] is read instead. In non-Italian communities, the haftara for Pinchas is only read in leap years in which 17 Tammuz is a Tuesday [when the previous 17 Tammuz was also a Tuesday] or Sunday, as it is in the summers of 2005, 2008, 2011, 2014, 2035, 2052, 2062, 2065, 2079, 2092; and, due to peculiarities in observing holidays in the Diaspora, it is also read in leap years in Eretz Yisrael when 17 Tammuz coincides with the Sabbath. See the note for the next Sabbath.)

- A, S, I: First Kings 18:46-19:21
- R: First Kings 18:46-19:16
- K, some R, Syracuse (Sicily): Malachi 2:5-3:3 (Syracuse ends at 3:4, R ends 3:8)

==== Pinchas (25:10-30:1), if on 17 Tammuz (Diaspora only), 19 Tammuz, 21 Tammuz, 23 Tammuz or 24 Tammuz ====
- A, S, Y, R, K: Jeremiah 1:1-2:3
- I: Joshua 13:15-33

==== Matot (30:2-32:42) ====
(This Sabbath, or the preceding one, begins the three Sabbaths before Tisha B'Av, the Three Sabbaths of Calamity, whose haftarot, at least for A and S, are two prophecies of Jeremiah, and one from Isaiah. In most years, Matot is combined with Masei and only the haftara for Masei is read; only in leap years when the preceding Tisha B'Av was a Tuesday [or in Eretz Yisrael when 9 Av coincides with the Sabbath] are Matot and Masei read on separate Sabbaths. In the Italian rite, only one Haftarah Calamity is read (on Devarim), and the haftarot of Pinchas and Matot follow the normal rules.)

- A, S, Y, R, K: Jeremiah 1:1-2:3
- I: Joshua 13:15-33
- Matot - Masei

(In most years Matot and Masei are combined in one Sabbath [exceptions are detailed above in the sections for Pinchas and Matot], and as customary only the second haftara - the one for Masei - is read. When this coincides with Rosh Chodesh, most communities read the "regular" haftarah, but some communities read the Haftarah for Shabbat Rosh Chodesh.)

- A: Jeremiah 2:4-28, and 3:4
- S, AH: Jeremiah 2:4-28, and 4:1-2
- I: Joshua 19:51-21:3
- R: Isaiah 1:1-27
- Y, some R: Jeremiah 1:1-19
- Algiers, some Y: Jeremiah 2:4-4:2

==== Masei (33:1-36:13) ====
- A: Jeremiah 2:4-28, and 3:4
- S, AH, R, Y: Jeremiah 2:4-28, and 4:1-2
- (acc to Hebrew Wikipedia) Y: Joshua 1:1-20
- I: Joshua 19:51–21:3.
- K: Joshua 20:1–9.

=== Deuteronomy ===
==== Devarim (1:1-3:22) ====
(This is always Shabbat Hazon, the Sabbath preceding Tisha B'Av)

- A, S, I, R, K: Isaiah 1:1-27 (in some congregations this is chanted, until verse 25, in the melody of Lamentations)
- Y: Isaiah 1:21-31
- Libya: Isaiah 22:1-13
- Djerba: Isaiah 22:1-14 (some Djerba add at end 1:27)

==== Va'etchanan (3:23–7:11) ====
(This is always Shabbat Nahamu, the first Sabbath after Tisha B'Av, and the first of the Seven Haftarot of Consolation)

- A, S, R, some I: Isaiah 40:1-26
- Y: Isaiah 40:1–27 & 41:17
- I: Isaiah 40:1–15
- K: Isaiah 40:1–22

==== Eikev (7:12–11:25) ====
- A, S, I, Y: Isaiah 49:14–51:3
- R: Isaiah 49:1–51:3
- Libya: Isaiah 49:1–50:10
- K: Isaiah 49:14–50:5

==== Re'eh (11:26–16:17) ====
(According to the Shulchan Aruch, if Rosh Hodesh Elul - which has its own haftara, namely Isaiah 66 - coincides with Shabbat Re'eh, the haftara of Re'eh, not for Rosh Hodesh Elul, is read because the Seven Sabbaths of Consolation must not be interrupted. However, the Rama disagrees, and most Ashkenazic communities read the haftorah for Shabbat Rosh Chodesh, since it too has words of consolation. Some communities, such as Frankfurt am Main read the Haftorah for Machar Chodesh when Rosh Chodesh elul falls on Sunday.)

- A, S, I, Y: Isaiah 54:11–55:5
- K: Isaiah 54:11–56:1
- a few Algerian (acc to Dotan) Isaiah 54:1–10

==== Shoftim (16:18–21:9) ====
- A, S, R, Y: Isaiah 51:12–52:12
- I: First Samuel 8:1–22
- K: Isaiah 51:12–52:8

==== Ki Teitzei (21:10–25:19) ====
(In those communities where they read the Haftorah for Shabbat Rosh Chodesh or Machar Chodesh two weeks ago, the custom is to "make up" the haftorah this week, since the haftarot follow each other. As such, in such communities in such years, they would read Isaiah 54:1–55:5)

- A, S, R, Y: Isaiah 54:1–10
- I: First Samuel 17:1–37
- K: Isaiah 54:1–17
- a few Algerian (acc to Dotan): Isaiah 54:11–55:5

==== Ki Tavo (26:1–29:8) ====
- A, S, R, Y: Isaiah 60:1-22
- I: Joshua 8:30–9:27
- K: Isaiah 60:1–16

==== Nitzavim (29:9–30:20) ====
(The last of the Seven Haftarot of Consolation. If Nitzavim and Vayelech are read together, the haftara of Nitzavim is read.)

- A, S, R: Isaiah 61:10–63:9
- Y: Isaiah 61:9–63:9
- I: Joshua 24:1–18
- Algiers (acc to Dotan): Hosea 14:2–10, and Joel 2:15–27, and Micah 7:18–20
- K: Isaiah 61:10–63:1
- Nitzavim – Vayelech
- Isaiah 61:10–63:9

==== Vayelech (31:1-30) ====
(It appears that Vayelech has no haftara portion of its own, because Vayelech either takes the haftara of Shabbat Shuvah or the haftara of Netzavim. If Shabbat Shuvah coincides with Haazinu, which usually happens, the parashah of Vayelech is shifted to the week of Netzavim; otherwise Vayelech falls between Rosh Hashana and Yom Kippur and so the haftara for Shabbat Shuva is read. Several editions - e.g., Hirsch, Hertz, ArtScroll - have assigned the Shabbat Shuva reading as the customary haftara for Vayelech, some others - such as the IDF and JPS1985 - have no haftara listed specifically for Vayelech.)

- A, S (acc to ArtScroll, JPS1917), I, Y, Algiers, Amsterdam, Frankfurt, Syracuse: Isaiah 55:6-56:8 (This reading from Isaiah is also used as the afternoon (Minchah ) haftara for minor fast days, such as Gedaliah or Esther.)

==== Haazinu (32:1-51) ====
(If the Sabbath of Haazinu coincides with Shabbat Shuvah, the Haftara for Vayelech is read.)

- A, S, R: Second Samuel 22:1-51
- APZ: Hosea 14:2–10; Joel 2:15–27
- I, Y: Ezekiel 17:22-18:32
- Algiers: Isaiah 61:10–63:9
- K: Hosea 14:2–10

==== V'Zot HaBerachah (33:1–34:12) ====
(This haftara is read on Simchat Torah, as that is when V'Zot HaBerachah is read, as opposed to on an ordinary shabbat.)

- A (including Hertz), AH, I: Joshua 1:1–18
- S, (acc to Hebrew Wikipedia) K: Joshua 1:1–9
- Y: Joshua 1:1–9 & 6:27
- K: Joshua 1:1–10
- Portuguese (acc to Dotan): Joshua 1:1–9, and Isaiah 61:1, and Isaiah 62:5.
- R: First Kings 9:22–34

=== Special Sabbaths, festivals, and fast days ===
In general, on the dates below, the haftarot below are read, even if that entails overriding the haftara for a Sabbath Torah portion. However, in certain communities, the first two haftarot below (that for Rosh Hodesh and that for the day preceding Rosh Hodesh) are replaced by the regular weekly haftara when the weekly reading is Masei(occurring in mid-summer) or later. Some of these occasions also have specific Torah readings, which (for A and S) are noted parenthetically.

- Sabbath coinciding with Rosh Hodesh, except Rosh Hodesh of the months of Adar, Nisan, Tevet, or (in some communities) Av or Elul; and except Rosh Hashanah

(Torah reading: Numbers 28:9-15, acc to JPS, Hirsch, Soncino Chumash; Numbers 28:1-15, acc to Hertz, ArtScroll)

- A, S, K: Isaiah 66:1–24 & repeat 66:23
- Y, AH: Isaiah 66:1–24 & repeat 66:23
- a few Djerba: Isaiah 66:5-24 & repeat 66:23

- Sabbath coinciding with the day preceding Rosh Chodesh, (known as Machar Hodesh ), except Rosh Hodesh of the months of Nisan, Tevet, Adar, or (in most communities) Elul and except Rosh Hashanah
  - First Samuel 20:18-42 (which begins, "Tomorrow is the new moon...")
    - Fez (acc to Dotan): additionally read the regular Haftara.

[The holidays and special Sabbaths are listed in their usual sequence during the year, starting with Rosh Hashanah ]

- First day of Rosh Hashanah (Torah reading: Genesis chap. 21 and Numbers 29:1-6)
  - A, S: First Samuel 1:1–2:20
  - I, Y, AH (and A and S acc to Benisch): First Samuel 1:1–2:10
  - R: First Samuel 2:1-2:21
  - K: Joel 2:15-2:27
- Second day of Rosh Hashanah (Torah reading: Genesis chap. 22 and Numbers 29:1-6)
  - A, AH, S, Y: Jeremiah 31:1–19 (Benisch begins at 31:2, because Benisch is referring to the non-Hebrew numeration of the book of Jeremiah)
  - I: Jeremiah 31:1–20
  - R: Jeremiah 31:19-31;29 (some R continue to verse 31:35)
  - Baghdad: Jeremiah 30:25-31:19
- Fast of Gedaliah, afternoon haftara (there is no morning haftara)
  - A, Y, AH, some S, some SM: Isaiah 55:6–56:8 (same as used on minchah of 9th of Av)
  - I: Hosea 14:2–10
  - (acc to Dotan, most Sephardic congregations have no haftara for Fast of Gedalia)
- Sabbath before Yom Kippur (Shabbat Shuvah) (Either Nitzavim-Vayeilech or Haazinu)
  - Hosea 14:2-10. Also, some communities add either Joel 2:15 (or 2:11)–27 or Micah 7:18–20. Hirsch says, because the Hosea reading ends on a sad note, A added the passage from Joel, S added the one from Micah. However, many communities nowadays add both these passages.
  - R, (Y, acc to Jerusalem Crown): Hosea 14:2-10
  - (acc to Hirsch as "prevalent custom") A, S: Hosea 14:2-10, Micah 7:18-20, Joel 2:11-27 (Dotan notes that this is done in "some communities" although contrary to the halachic practice) (ArtScroll has Joel as second, Micah as last; Dotan notes this is used in "a few communities", Hirsch says this is the practice in Eretz Yisrael.)
  - (acc to Hertz) A, S: Hosea 14:2-10, Micah 7:18-20, Joel 2:15-27
  - A (acc to Dotan, Koren, Hirsch, Jerusalem Crown, Lindo): Hosea 14:2–10, and Joel 2:15–27 (Benisch lists this as the A haftara for Haazinu)
  - S (acc to Dotan, Koren, Hirsch, Benisch, Lindo, & Jerusalem Crown), & AH: Hosea 14:2–10, and Micah 7:18–20
  - The choice of the reading from Hosea is almost universal because its opening words are Shuvah Yisrael - "Return, O Israel, to the Lord your God". "Some few congregations" (according to ArtScroll) read Isaiah 55:6–56:8 (the haftara associated with Vayelech and with the minchah of fast days) instead; this is also mentioned as one option in the Posen book. (Some lists or books have no specific entry for Shabbat Shuva, leading to the supposition that the haftara usually associated with the week's parashah - usually Vayelech - is to be read; and some apply a more complex exchange of haftarot if there is - as often occurs - a Sabbath in the four days between Yom Kippur and the beginning of Sukkot;in which case that Sabbath is Parashat Haazinu.)
- Yom Kippur, morning haftara (Torah reading: Leviticus chap. 16 and Numbers 29:7-11)
  - A, S, AH: Isaiah 57:14–58:14 (R begin at 57:15)
  - Y, I: Isaiah 57:14-58:14 & 59:20-21
- Yom Kippur, afternoon haftara (Torah reading: Leviticus chap. 18)
  - the entire Book of Jonah, and Micah 7:18–20 (some communities omit the part from Micah)
  - I: Obadiah 1:21, the entire Book of Jonah, and Micah 7:18–20
- First day of Sukkot (Torah reading: Leviticus 22:26-23:44 and Numbers 29:12-16)
  - A, S, AH, K: Zechariah 14:1–21 (R end with verse 19)
  - Y, Aleppo: Zechariah 13:9–14:21
- Second day of Sukkot (in the Diaspora) (Torah reading: Leviticus 22:26-23:44 and Numbers 29:12-16)
  - A, S, AH, R: First Kings 8:2–21 (R ends with 8:20)
  - Y, I: First Kings 7:51–8:16
- Sabbath of the intermediate days of Sukkot (Shabbat Hol Hamoed Sukkot) (Torah reading: Exodus 33:12-34:26 and the appropriate reading from Numbers 29)
  - A, S, R: Ezekiel 38:18–39:16
  - Y, some I, Persia, and Aleppo: Ezekiel 38:1–38:23
  - some I, APZ, R: Ezekiel 38:18–39:16 (some I, and Posen ends at 39:10)
- Shemini Atzeret (in the Diaspora) (Torah reading: Deuteronomy 14:22-16:17 and Numbers 29:35-30:1)
  - First Kings 8:54–66 (I, some A end at verse 9:1; R end at 9:5)
  - K: Jonah (entire)
- Simhat Torah (Torah reading: Deuteronomy 33:1-34:12 ° and Genesis 1:1-2:3 and Numbers 29:35-30:1) (° the reading from Deuteronomy is divided into two parts, the first ending with 33:26)
  - A, AH, I: Joshua 1:1–18
  - S, Y: Joshua 1:1–9 (Y add verse 6:27) (some S follow this with the haftara used for a bridegroom [Isaiah 61:10-62:8].)
  - R: First Kings 8:22–34 (this is the reading originally assigned by the Talmud for this day.)
- First (or only) Sabbath of Hanukkah

(This haftara is recommended in the Talmud (Megillah 31a), in all traditions, includes Zechariah 3:2, which contains the very rarely used cantillation accent of mercha kefula, under zeh - "this [burning stick]". It appears there was an ancient custom to read, or to read additionally, First Kings 7:51-8:21, describing the dedication of the first Temple.)

- A, S, AH: Zechariah 2:14–4:7
- Y: Zechariah 2:14–4:9

- Second Sabbath of Hanukkah
  - A, S, Y, I: First Kings 7:40–50 (this is also the A haftara for Vayakhel, which is also very seldom read (it's only read in leap years when the preceding Rosh Hashanah was a Thursday) because it often coincides with Pekudei or with a special Sabbath, and in fact the two readings of this haftara will never occur in the same year.)
  - R: First Kings 7:27–47
- Sabbath immediately preceding the second day of Adar (or of Second Adar) (Shabbat Shekalim): ° (Torah reading: Exodus 30:11-16)
  - A, Y: Second Kings 12:1–17 (this is the selection recommended in the Talmud, Megillah 29b)
  - S, AH: Second Kings 11:17–12:17
  - R, K: Ezekiel 45:12-46:5 (° The first of four Sabbaths preceding Passover. It occurs on the Sabbath that either coincides with the New Moon, or precedes the New Moon that occurs during the following week, of the month of Second Adar — or of Adar in an ordinary year. These four Sabbaths may be the oldest assigned haftarot, from Tosefta, Megillah ch.4.)
- Sabbath immediately preceding Purim (Shabbat Zachor) (Torah reading: Deuteronomy 25:17-19)
  - A, AH: First Samuel 15:2–34
  - APZ: First Samuel 15:2–33
  - S: First Samuel 15:1–34
  - Y: First Samuel 14:52–15:33
- Purim - no haftara is read.
- Sabbath Shushan Purim (in cities that celebrate only ordinary Purim):
  - No special haftara: the usual haftara for that week's parashah is read.
- Sabbath Shushan Purim (in cities that celebrate it): (same haftara as for Parashat Zachor)
  - A, AH: First Samuel 15:2–34
  - S: First Samuel 15:1–34
  - Y: First Samuel 14:52–15:33
- Sabbath immediately following Shushan Purim (Shabbat Parah): (Torah reading: Numbers 19:1-22)
  - A: Ezekiel 36:16–38
  - S, AH, Y: Ezekiel 36:16–36
- Sabbath immediately preceding the second day of Nisan (Shabbat HaChodesh): ° (Torah reading: Exodus 12:1-20)
  - A: Ezekiel 45:16–46:18
  - APZ: Ezekiel 45:18–46:15
  - S, AF (& AH acc to Dotan): Ezekiel 45:18–46:15
    - AH: Ezekiel 45:18–46:16
    - Algiers: Ezekiel 45:18-46:15 & 47:12
  - Y: Ezekiel 45:9–46:11
  - I: Ezekiel 45:18–46:18

(° If Rosh Hodesh Nisan coincides with Parashat Hahodesh, then the haftara for Hahodesh, not for Rosh Hodesh, is read because the obligation of this special parashah is greater. Dotan says that if Shabbat Hahodesh coincides with Rosh Hodesh, then S and SZ add to the Hahodesh haftara the first and last verses of the haftara of Rosh Hodesh [namely, Isaiah 66:1 & 66:23], if Shabbat Hahodesh falls on the day before Rosh Hodesh, then they add the first and last verses of the haftara for the Eve of Rosh Hodesh [namely First Samuel 20:18 & 20:42].)

- Sabbath immediately preceding Passover (Shabbat HaGadol)
  - Malachi 3:4-24 & repeat 3:23
    - Y, some AH, AF, some SM: read the regular haftara for that week°

°The Levush records that "some communities" read the special haftara only when Erev Pesach falls on Shabbat Hagadol (meaning the first seder is celebrated that Saturday night) - which occurs infrequently, and "other communities" (practice of the Vilna Gaon, cited in Maase Rav) read the special haftara on Shabbat HaGadol only if Erev Pesach falls on another day of the week. Erev Pesach falls on Shabbat HaGadol in the spring of 1994, 2001, 2005, 2008, 2021, 2025, 2045, 2048, 2052, 2072, 2075, 2079, and 2099.

- First day of Passover (Torah reading: Exodus 12:21-51, and Numbers 28:16-25)
  - Joshua 5:2-6:1 & 6:27
    - AH, (and A, acc to Dotan, SCJ, and Benisch): Joshua 3:5–7, 5:2-6:1, & 6:27 (the Munkatcher Rebbe omitted verse 3:7), ('Hertz' omitted Joshua 3:5-7)
    - AF, R, and Perushim: Joshua 5:2–6:1
- Second day of Passover (in the Diaspora, outside of Eretz Yisrael) (Torah reading: Leviticus 22:26-23:44 and Numbers 28:16-25)
  - A, S, AH: Second Kings 23:1–9 & 23:21–25 °

(° Many, perhaps most, skip verses 23:10-20, but the Vilna Gaon recommended that these verses be read - except verse 13, because it mentions a shameful deed by King Solomon. Some congregations begin the reading at 23:4.)

  - APZ: Second Kings 23:4–9, 23:21–30
  - Y: Second Kings 22:1–7 & 23:21–25
  - I: Second Kings 23:1–9 & 23:21–30
  - K: Second Kings 23:21–30
- Sabbath of the intermediate days of Passover (Shabbat Hol Hamoed Pesach) ° (Torah reading: Exodus 33:12-34:26 and Numbers 28:19-25)
  - A, S: Ezekiel 37:1–17
    - AH: Ezekiel 37:1–14
  - Y: Ezekiel 36:37–37:14
  - I, R (and A and S, acc to Benisch): Ezekiel 36:37–37:17 (acc to Benisch, S stop at 37:14)
- Seventh day of Passover (Torah reading: Exodus 13:17-15:26 and Numbers 28:19-25)
  - Second Samuel 22:1–51 (Aleppo begins at 21:15)
  - K: Judges 5:1–31
- Eighth day of Passover (in the Diaspora) (Torah reading: if not a Sabbath, Deuteronomy 15:19-16:17, if on a Sabbath Deuteronomy 14:22-16:17, and Numbers 28:19-25)
  - Isaiah 10:32–12:6 (also read in some communities on Yom Ha'atzmaut)
  - R: Judges 5:1–31
- First day of Shavuot (Torah reading: Exodus 19:1-20:22 and Numbers 28:26-31)
  - A, S, AH: Ezekiel 1:1–28 & 3:12 °
  - Y: Ezekiel 1:1–2:2 & 3:12 °
  - K: Habakkuk 1:1–3:19

(° The Shulchan Aruch directs the reading of Ezekiel 1:1 through 3:12 continuously, but most skip all or part of chapter 2 and skip to 3:12. Because the first chapter of Ezekiel describes the Heavenly Chariot, this haftara is customarily read and expounded by a rabbi or an esteemed scholar, in keeping with the direction of the Mishna, Hagigah 2:1.)

- Second day of Shavuot (in the Diaspora) (Torah reading: if not a Sabbath Deuteronomy 15:19-16:17, if on a Sabbath Deuteronomy 14:22-16:17, and Numbers 28:26-31)
  - Habakkuk 2:20–3:19 °

(° Many A congregations, after reading the first verse of the haftara (namely 2:20), then read an Aramaic piyyut (poem), Yetziv Pisgam, extolling God's infinite power, after which the reading from Habakkuk resumes. A minority of congregations recite a different poem, Ata Vedugma, instead, and some do not interrupt the haftara with any poem.)

  - R, some A: Habakkuk 3:1-3:19
- Tisha B'Av, morning haftara (Torah reading: Deuteronomy 4:25-40)
  - A, S, AH: Jeremiah 8:13–9:23 (chanted in the Eastern Ashkenazic rite to the melody used for the Scroll of Lamentations, and in the Western Ashkenazic rite to a sad tune not directly connected to the cantillation)
  - Y: Jeremiah 6:16–17 & 8:13–9:23
- Tisha B'Av, afternoon haftara
  - A, AH: Isaiah 55:6–56:8
  - most S: Hosea 14:2–10 (the reading from Hosea was first mentioned, as optional, for this service by Isaac Ibn Ghiyath, Spain ca. 1080, and is used by all except A)
  - Y, I: Hosea 14:2–10 & Micah 7:18–20
- Fast days (other than those listed above), no morning haftara; afternoon haftara: (Torah reading: Exodus 32:11-14 and 34:1-10)
  - A, and Algiers (acc to Dotan): Isaiah 55:6–56:8
  - S, Y: none
  - some SM (acc to Dotan): Hosea 14:2–10, and Micah 7:18–20.
- Sabbath coinciding with Rosh Chodesh Elul °
  - Isaiah 66:1–24 & repeat 66:23 (° According to the Shulchan Aruch, if Rosh Hodesh [the new moon] - which has its own haftara (namely Isaiah 66) - coincides with Shabbat Re'eh, then the haftara of Re'eh (Isaiah 54:11-55:5), not the haftara for Rosh Hodesh, is read because the seven Sabbaths of Consolation must not be interrupted. However, in Frankfurt and Eastern Europe, it is the custom in such an occurrence to read the haftara for Rosh Hodesh instead, and the second Sabbath afterward, which would be Parashat Ki Tetze, would double up and read first the haftara Ki Tetze (Isaiah 54:1-10) and then haftara Re'eh.)

=== For a bridegroom ===
It was customary in many communities to read Isaiah 61:10 – 62:8 (Italic would read 61:9 - 62:9) if a bridegroom (who had married within the previous week) was present in the synagogue. The customs varied:

- In some communities, this entire haftara was read, supplanting the usual haftara of that week.
- In some communities, only a few verses (possibly Isaiah 61:10 - 62:5, although the literature is unclear) were read. They were read after the usual haftara, either before or after — depending on local custom — the closing blessings of the haftara.

When a Talmudically specified haftara was to be read on a certain Sabbath (e.g., on Sabbath of Hanukkah), some communities did not read the bridegroom's haftara, preferring to keep to the standard haftara of the week. Again, customs varied:

- In some communities, the bridegroom's haftara was read.
- Some communities, even though they normally read the entire bridegroom's haftara for a bridegroom, now merely appended a few verses of it to the weekly haftara.
- Some communities omitted the bridegroom's haftara altogether, reading the weekly haftara instead.

Nowadays, this custom has virtually disappeared, and it is preserved only in Karaites and in Italian communities, where it is appended to the regular Haftara.
