= Maftir =

Last person called up to the Torah on Shabbat and holiday mornings

Maftir (Hebrew: מפטיר, lit. 'concluder') is the last person called up to the Torah on Shabbat and holiday mornings: this person also reads (or at least recites the blessings over) the haftarah portion from a related section of the Nevi'im (prophetic books).

Informally, the portion of the Torah read or blessed by the maftir is called the "maftir portion", or the "maftir" for short: in a Chumash, the word "maftir" is printed in the margin at the beginning of that portion.

On a normal Shabbat morning, seven people are formally called up to the Torah, and a part of the week's Torah portion is read by or to each of them. The maftir is not counted among the seven, and is sometimes not formally called up by name: on the conclusion of the seventh reading and after reciting Chatzi kaddish, in some communities the gabbai simply calls "maftir" (or in Western Ashkenazic communities does not call at all and the Maftir simply goes up) and repeats the last few verses in the presence of the maftir.

On Jewish holidays and certain special Shabbatot, there are readings from two or more Torah scrolls. On these occasions, some call the maftir by name, followed by the word "maftir", and the reading from the last scroll is read in his presence. On Tisha b'Av morning and fast day afternoons, the maftir portion is the third (and final) section of the portion.

After the Torah reading, the maftir says the blessings for the haftarah, and in most communities reads it (in communities where the Haftarah is read from a Klaf, the Maftir will usually just recite the blessings, and the Baal Koreh will read the Haftarah itself).

== Holiday selections ==
The maftir portion for the Festivals and for Rosh Chodesh that occurs on Shabbat comes from the appropriate paragraph in Numbers 28 or 29, describing the sacrifice for the day.

The maftir portion for Shabbat during Chanukah comes from Numbers 7, describing the dedication offering of the Mishkan (Tabernacle during the wilderness journeys) corresponding to the day of Chanukah where Shabbat occurs.

== Double maftir ==
Shabbat Chanukah and two of the special Shabbatot (Shekalim and HaChodesh) sometimes coincide with Rosh Chodesh. When this happens, the portion for Shabbat Rosh Chodesh is read from a second scroll, then the special maftir portion for that special Shabbat from a third. Only the person called to the third scroll reads the haftarah, though the haftarah itself may contain verses appropriate both to Rosh Chodesh and to Chanukah or the special Shabbat.

== See also ==
- Haftarah
- Torah reading
- Liturgical Use: The Haftarah
