= Elijah ben Solomon Abraham ha-Kohen =

18th-century Ottoman rabbi and writer

Rabbi Eliyahu ben Solomon Abraham ha-Kohen ha-Itamari (1640–1729) was a Dayan, almoner and preacher. He was born in Smyrna, where he was educated by R. Benjamin Melamed (he records the eulogy in Midrash Eliyahu), a leading Rabbi of İzmir (Smyrna), and became a homiletic preacher. R. Eliyahu's opposition to Sabbatai Zevi and his associates earned him much grief at home. He apparently cared for orphans as his writings display an extremely detailed knowledge of the physical and psychological suffering of the poor. A prolific writer, he is best remembered for his ethical work Shevet Mussar (Rod of Admonition), which has seen numerous editions and been translated into many languages. The first edition of Shevet Mussar was issued in Constantinople in 1712.

== Works ==
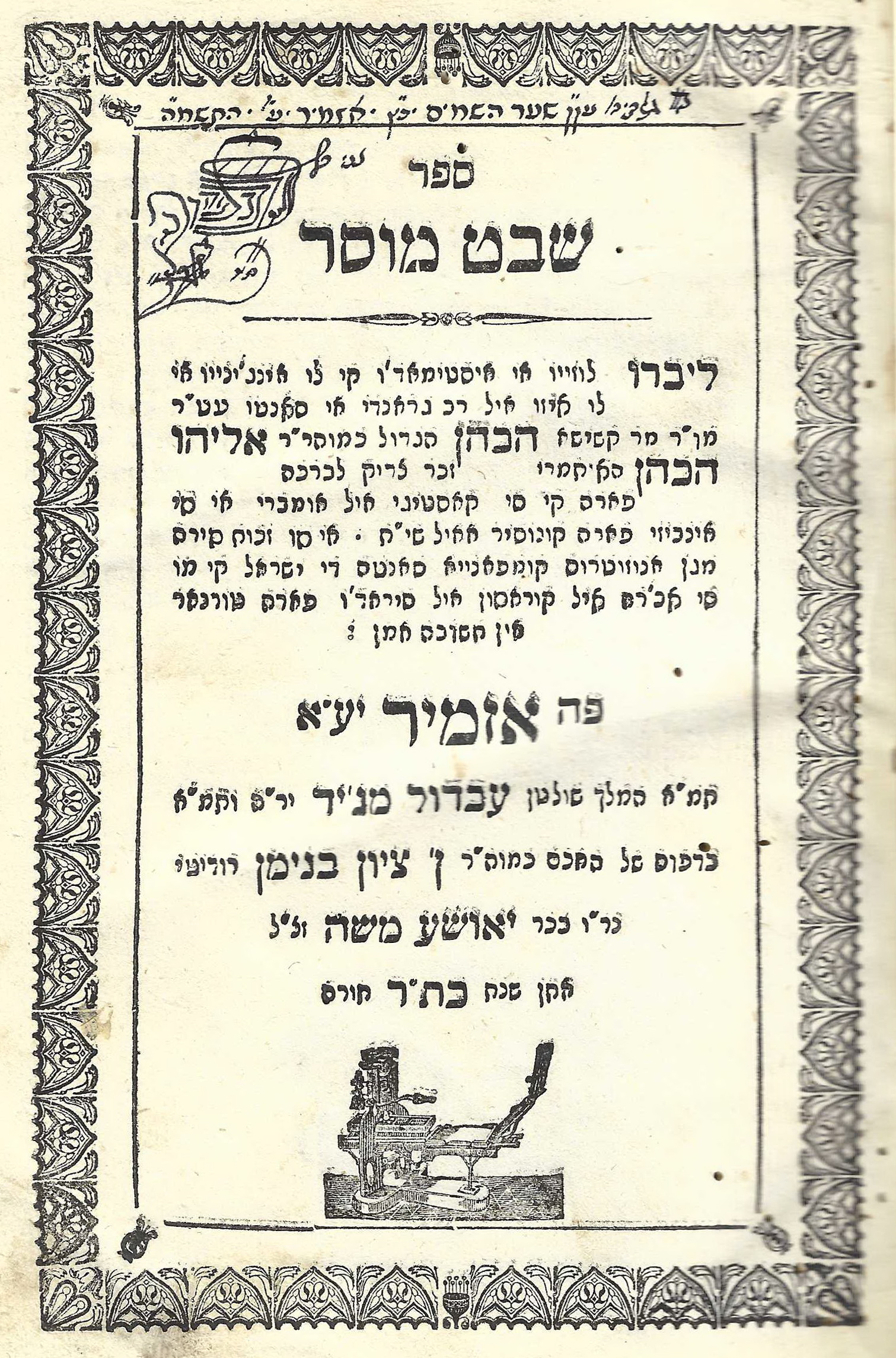
Title page of the book "Shevet Musar" in Ladino translation, Izmir, year 5620 (1860)

Eliyahu produced over 30 works, of which the principal, according to Ruwen Josef Wunderbar (Orient, Lit. p. 579), are as follows:

- Midrash Eliyahu, eleven funeral sermons and a commentary on the Talmudic sayings relative to the Book of Esther (Constantinople, 1693)
- Midrash ha-Itamari, homilies (ib. 1695)
- Midrash Talpiyyot, glosses and comments taken from 300 works and containing 926 (the numerical value of the word "Talpiyyot") paragraphs in alphabetical order: only the first part, from "alef" to "kaf," was published (Amsterdam, 1698)
- Me'il Ẓedaḳah, a treatise on charity (ib. 1704)
- Shebeṭ Musar, an ethical and moral treatise composed of 52 chapters, each intended to be studied weekly throughout the year. First published in 1712, the book quickly gained widespread popularity across Jewish communities. Its accessible style and deep spiritual insights led to numerous reprints and translations into several languages, including Ladino, making it a cornerstone of Sephardic ethical literature. The work offers guidance on personal conduct, repentance, and spiritual growth, and remains influential in both traditional and modern Jewish thought. It was taken for the most part from the Or Ḳadmon of Moses Ḥagis, the Tokaḥot of the Spanish poets, the Orḥot Ḥayyim, and the Roḳeaḥ of Eleazar of Worms (Constantinople, 1712)
- Megalleh Ẓefunot, commentary on the Chumash (Porizk, 1785)
- She'elot u-Teshubot, responsa (Sudilkov, 1796)
- Minḥat Eliyahu, sermons (Salonica, 1824)
- Semukim le-'Ad, homiletic treatise on the parashiyyot (ib. 1826)
- We-Lo 'Od Ella, a treatise on the Talmudic and Midrashic passages beginning with these words (Smyrna, 1853)
- Ezor Eliyahu, a commentary to Pirkei Avot (Jerusalem, 1981)
- Agadat Eliyahu a commentary on the aggadic passages of the Jerusalem Talmud of Zeraim and Moed (Smyrna, 1755)

Elijah's other works are not yet published (as of 1906). They include:

- a commentary to the Psalms
- Ezor Eliyahu, a commentary to the Pesaḥ Haggadah
- Ṭa'ame ha-Miẓwot, a treatise on the 613 commandments
- Sheloshah Mahadurot, a commentary to the Pentateuch
- Shiṭṭah, on the Abodah Zarah
- a commentary to the difficult passages in the Ta'anit
- a commentary to the Hafṭarot
- Ḥiddushim Nifradim, Yado ha-Kol, comprising commentaries to the Song of Songs, Book of Ruth, and Book of Esther, each under a different title
- mystical glosses to the Song of Songs and Esther
- a commentary to Lamentations
- commentaries to Pirḳe Rabbi Eliezer, Otiyyot de-Rabbi Aḳiba, Kallah, Semaḥot, Derek Ereẓ Rabbah and Derek Ereẓ Zuṭa, Tanna debe Eliyahu, and Tiḳḳune ha-'Aberot
- one treatise and three sermons on repentance
- a commentary to various prayers

== Jewish Encyclopedia bibliography ==
- Azulai, Shem ha-Gedolim, i. 22;
- Michael, Heimann Joseph, (1891) Or ha-Ḥayyim, Frankfort-on-the-Main (in Hebrew), No. 407:
- Jellinek, B. H. i. 16, Preface;
- Steinschneider, Cat. Bodl. col. 932;
- Fürst, Bibl. Jud. i. 238;
- Friedenstein, 'Ir Gibborim.
