= Judah ben Jacob Najar =

Tunisian rabbi (??–1830)

Judah ben Jacob Najar (died 1830) was a Talmudic scholar, author, dayyan, nephew of Judah Cohen Tanugi, and member of the rabbinate in Tunis, where he died at an advanced age. He was the author of the following works:

- Limmude Adonai (Leghorn, 1787), containing 204 hermeneutic rules bearing on Talmudical subjects, together with some funeral orations
- Alfe Yehudah (ib. 1794), commentary on Shavu'ot, with an appendix
- Shevut Yehudah (ib. 1801), commentary on the Mekhilta, with text
- Mo'ade Adonai (ib. 1808), commentary on parts of the SeMaG, published together with the commentaries of Elijah Mizraḥi, Solomon Luria, and Isaac Stein (to this work has been added Ḳonṭres Sheni to the work Shevut Yehudah, with separate pagination)
- Simḥat Yehudah (Pisa, 1816), commentary on Keritot, Soferim, Semaḥot, Kallah, Derekh eretz, and Avot de-Rabbi Natan
- Ḥayye Yehudah (ib. 1816), commentary on Gerim, Avodim, and Kuttim
- Ohole Yehudah (Leghorn, 1823), commentary on Sifre, with text and some decisions.

== Jewish Encyclopedia bibliography ==
- Cazés, Notes Bibliographiques, pp. 261 et seq.;
- Joseph Zedner, Cat. Hebr. Books Brit. Mus. p. 604;
- Julius Fürst, Bibl. Jud. iii. 11.
