= Moses Judah Abbas =

17th-century Talmudist and Hebrew poet

Moses Judah ben Meir Abbas (Hebrew: משה יהודה בן מאיר עבאס, romanized: Moshe Yehudah Abbas; c. 1601–1671), also known by the acronym Mashya (משי״ע), was a 17th-century Talmudist and Hebrew poet.

Abbas was born in Salonika (back then part of the Ottoman Empire) into a prominent Sephardi literary family. He later settled in Egypt, where he founded a yeshiva and Talmud Torah, and, in the last years of his life, served as a rabbi in Rosetta. He left a commentary entitled Kisse kavod on the minor tractates Kallah, Soferim, and Semaḥot, and several responsa, which exist in manuscript form in the Bodleian collection.
