= Derekh eretz =

Good behavior in Judaism

Derekh eretz (Hebrew: דרך ארץ, lit. 'way [of the] land') (Note: Variably spelled derech eretz.) is a term appearing in the corpus of Rabbinic literature. It has a wide range of meanings, referring to appropriate behavior, good manners, and earning a livelihood, among others. Derekh Eretz Rabbah and Derekh Eretz Zutta are minor tractates of the Talmud.

== Appropriate behaviour and good character ==
In the Talmud and Midrash, there are approximately 200 teachings using the term derech eretz to mean decent, polite, respectful, thoughtful, and civilized behavior.

There are many more such teachings in the rishonim and acharonim (post-Talmudic authorities). The mussar literature, in fact, presents an entire body of thought devoted to the subject of middot (character traits) and "behaving like a mensch" (refined human being, lit. a mature man). Here, the way that one behaves is regarded as an external manifestation of one's middot.

=== Etiquette ===
Derekh eretz can be a reference to etiquette, politeness, and similar social conventions. For example, the Shulchan Aruch includes a section specifying proper table manners.

=== Proper behavior precedes the Torah ===
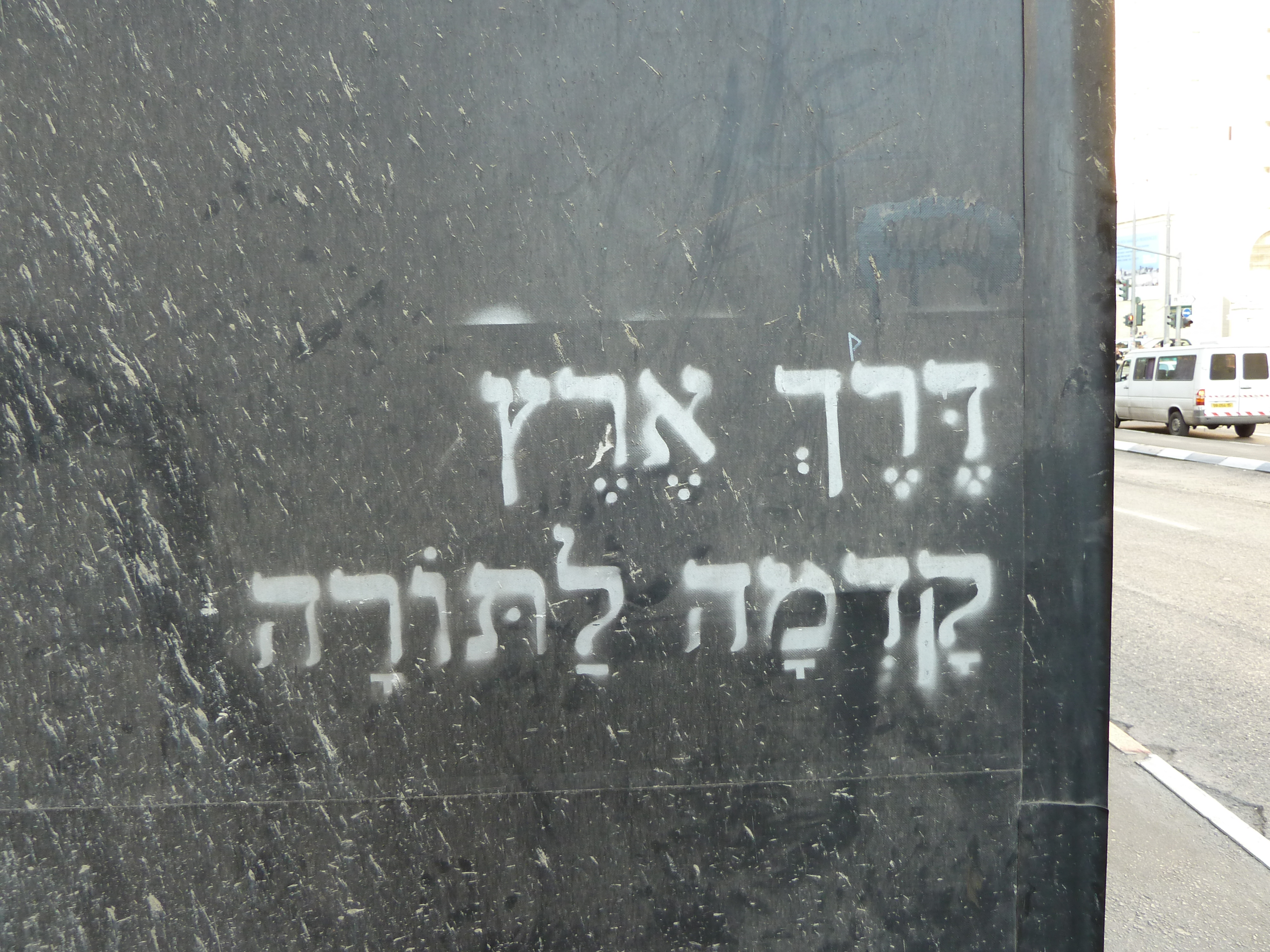
Graffiti in Jerusalem דֶּרֶךְ אֶרֶץ קָדְמָה לַתּוֹרָה

One notable teaching states:

Derech Eretz preceded the giving of the Torah by twenty-six generations. This is as is written [in the Torah]: "To guard the way of the tree of life (Gen 3:24) - "the way" [derech] refers to derech eretz, and afterwards "tree of life" refers to Torah.

The number 26 comes from Biblical chronology, in which 26 generations passed between Adam (the first human after creation) and Moses (to whom the Torah was given).

This teaching has been summarized and translated as "Proper behavior precedes the Torah", "decent behavior precedes Torah" or "Decorum came before the giving of the Law".

This has been interpreted as implying that one cannot personify Torah until he demonstrates derech eretz, and before one can practice the mitzvot of the Torah, he or she must practice decent behavior, good personality traits, and the like.

Similarly, on the level of humanity, this teaching suggests that the Torah was not given during the earliest years of humanity because it was first necessary to have proper preparation in terms of moral behavior. Thus, non-Jews are capable of meaningful moral choices even though they do not follow the Torah. This also leads to the conclusion that advances in Torah knowledge must never weaken natural morality. In this view, "proper moral behavior must precede the Torah, but after the Torah has been revealed based on the prior existence of proper behavior, a new and higher-level moral code is derived from the Torah."

Some interpreters note that the Torah tells the stories of Avraham, Isaac and Yaakov at length before continuing to its ostensible purpose, the teaching of mitzvot. This suggests that that proper character traits, especially those related to relationships between people, takes precedence over the religious mandates of the Torah. Alternatively, the patriarchs and matriarchs serve as models for decent behavior; by following their example, people become suitable vessels for receiving and internalizing the Torah.

Rabbi Nachman of Breslov takes the words comes before (in the above maxim) in a chronologic sense. Thus, "Derech eretz comes before Torah", means that Derech Eretz is the original method to know part of the truth, and existed before the gift of the Torah.

A similar teaching appears in Pirkei Avot: "If there is no Derech Eretz there is no Torah, and if there is no Torah there is no Derech Eretz."

== Sexual relations ==
Derech eretz can be a euphemism for sexual relations.

== Earning a livelihood ==
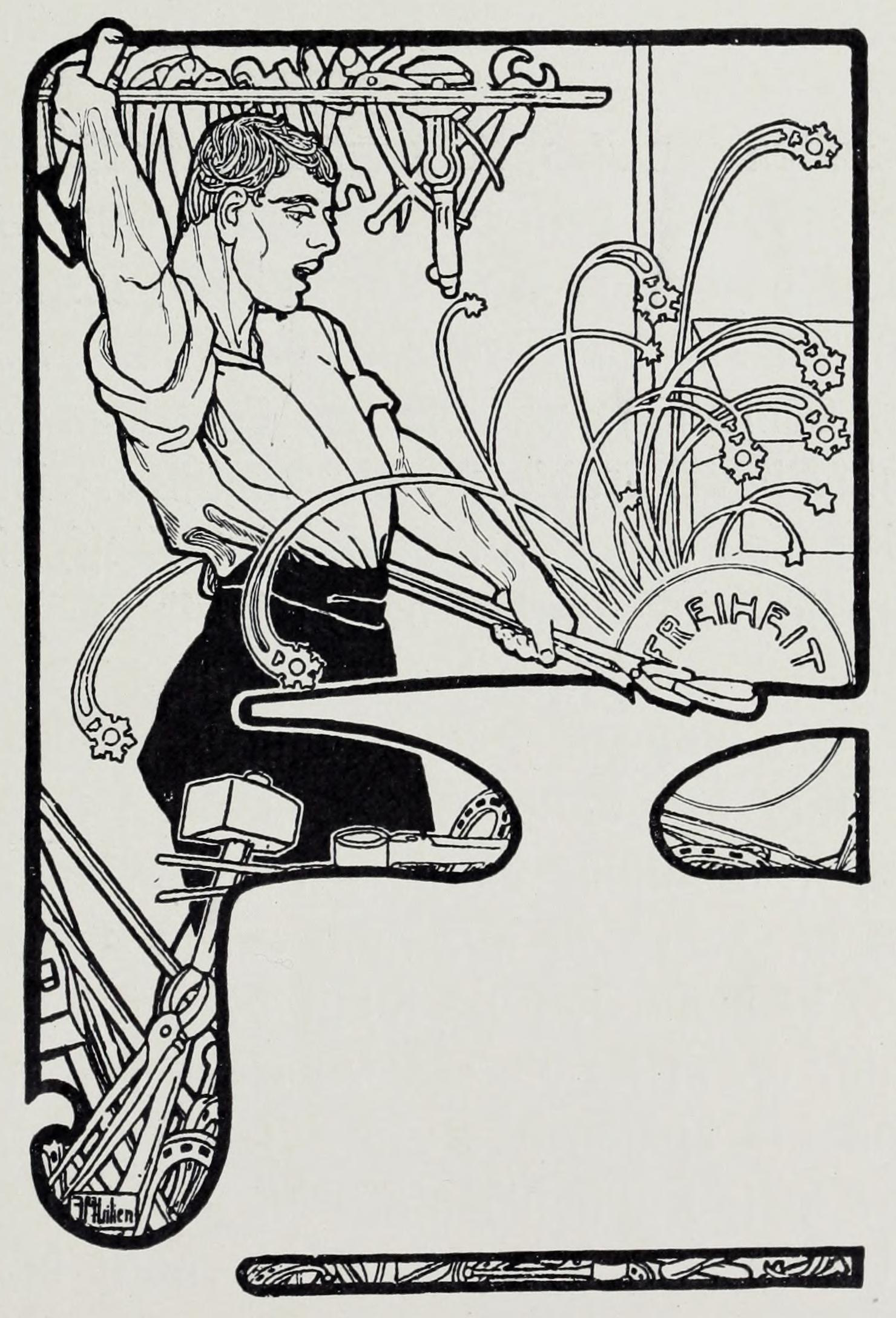
A blacksmith at work. Illustration by Ephraim Moses Lilien (1874–1925).

Pirkei Avot states: "Excellent is Torah study accompanied by derech eretz, for toil in both of them causes sin to be forgotten." The phrase derech Eretz in this passage is generally taken to mean "earning a livelihood".

In consonance, Rabbinic opinion has a general requirement for earning a livelihood, but in such a fashion that one may also study and live Torah. This attitude is codified in Jewish Law as follows: "[One] should work every day, sufficient for his living... and should busy himself with Torah the rest of the day and night; one who supports himself with his own hands is on a great level". The Talmud teaches that "One who does not teach his son a profession, teaches him thievery." Psalms 128:2 states that "If you eat of toil of your hands, fortunate are you, and good is to you", representing the general value assigned to work in and of itself.

At the same time, the praise of work in rabbinic literature is paired with a simultaneous warning against materialism. Mishna Berurah states that working people should resist the "temptation" to earn ever more money, and instead figure out what level of wealth they really need, in order that their business activities are secondary to their Torah study. Kitzur Shulchan Aruch requires that a working person "not aspire to accumulate wealth, but [rather] pursue your work in order to support your family, to give charity, and to raise your children to study the Torah..." See also Jewish business ethics § Ethical perspective.

Rabbinic tradition therefore recognizes that achieving an appropriate balance could pose both practical and philosophic challenges (e.g., the requirement for secular education as opposed to limited vocational training), and the various issues are therefore widely discussed: (i) in various tractates in the Talmud; (ii) in the halakhic literature; (iii) as well as in Jewish philosophy, Hasidic thought and Musar (ethical) literature (see discussion under Divine providence in Judaism).

In Kabbalistic and Chassidic thought, also, work is seen as having positive value: the 39 melachos, encompassing all the types of work, were necessary in order to build the Tabernacle. Work became a necessity when Adam ate from the Tree of the knowledge of good and evil, causing the sparks of holiness to fall to the Other Side. All human work, regardless of its spiritual or material purpose, serves to rebuild those Shattered Vessels. One who conducts his work or business honorably is considered as though he builds the Tabernacle.

== Knowledge of culture and society ==
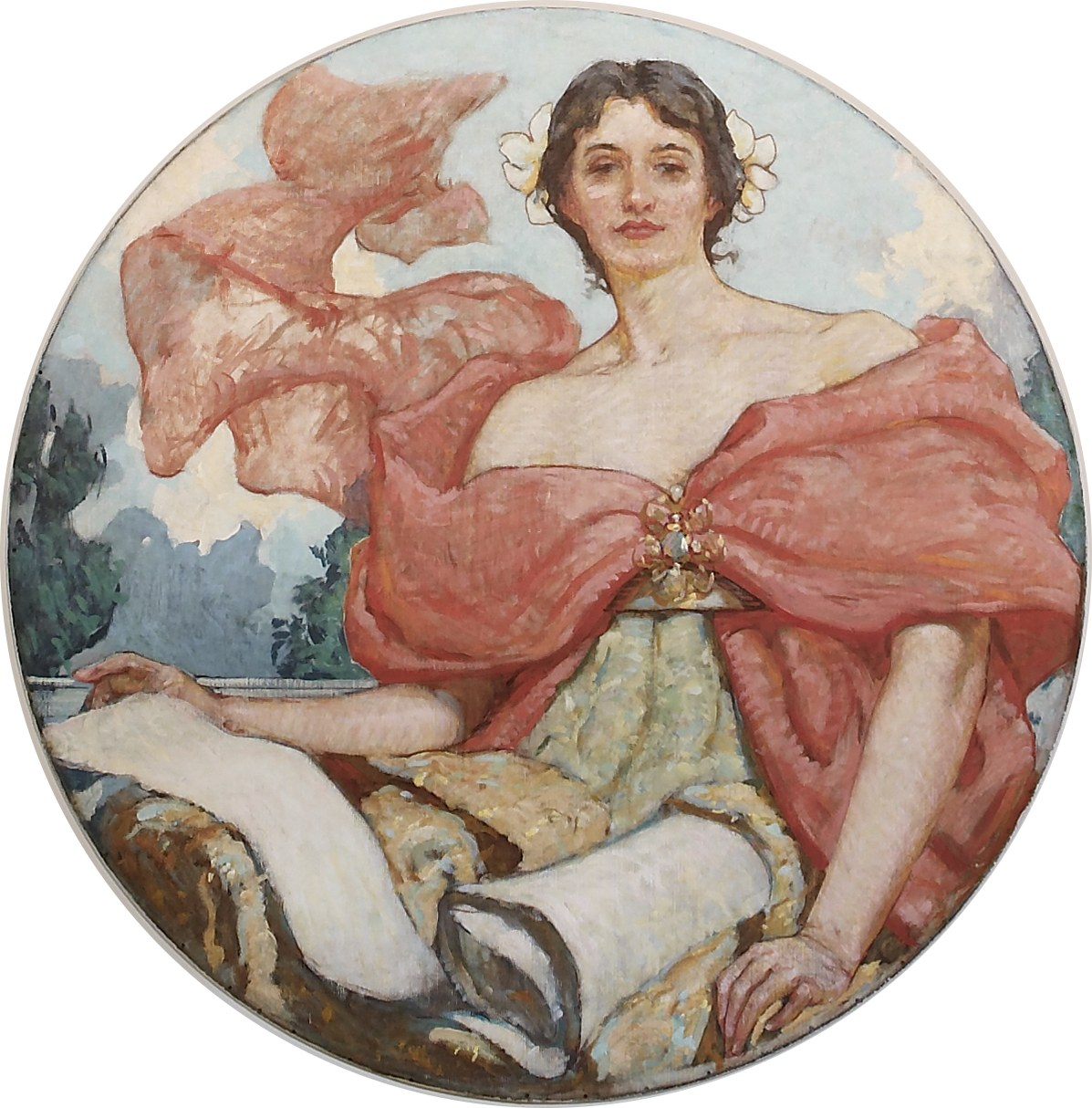
Understanding, mural by Robert Lewis Reid (1862–1929) in Library of Congress Thomas Jefferson Building, Washington, D.C.

Rabbi Samson Raphael Hirsch (1808–1888) was among the first to extend the definition of Derech Eretz to include a broad knowledge of, and appropriate interaction with, culture and society. Hirsch states that:

Derech Eretz includes everything that results from the fact that man's existence, mission and social life are conducted on Earth, using earthly means and conditions. Therefore this term especially describes ways of earning a livelihood and maintaining the social order. It also includes the customs and considerations of etiquette that the social order generates as well as everything concerning humanistic and civil education.

Hirsch's conception also entails the qualification that there be no compromise on strict adherence to Jewish law. The resulting philosophy of Orthodox Judaism in the modern world is known by the name Torah im Derech Eretz.
