= Seder Olam Rabbah =

2nd-century CE biblical chronology

Seder Olam Rabbah (Hebrew: סדר עולם רבה, "The Great Order of the World") is a 2nd-century CE Hebrew language chronology detailing the dates of biblical events from creation to Alexander the Great's conquest of Persia. It adds no stories beyond what is in the biblical text, and addresses such questions as the age of Isaac at his binding and the number of years that Joshua led the Israelites. Tradition considers it to have been written about 160 CE by Jose ben Halafta, but it was probably also supplemented and edited at a later period.

== Name ==
In the Babylonian Talmud this chronicle is several times referred to simply as Seder Olam, and it is quoted as such by the more ancient biblical commentators, including Rashi. But starting in the 12th century, it began to be designated as Seder Olam Rabbah to distinguish it from a later, smaller chronicle, Seder Olam Zuṭa; it was first so designated by Abraham ben Nathan Ha-Yarhi.

== Structure ==
In its present form, Seder Olam Rabbah consists of 30 chapters, each 10 chapters forming a section or "gate."

The work is a chronological record, extending from Adam to the revolt of Bar Kokba in the reign of Hadrian, the Persian period being compressed into 52 years. The chronicle is complete only up to the time of Alexander the Great; the period from Alexander to Hadrian occupies a very small portion of the work—the end of the 30th chapter.

Many passages quoted in the Talmud are missing in the edition of Seder Olam which has survived.

== Methodology ==
The author probably designed the work for calendrical purposes, to determine the era of the creation; his system, adopted as early as the 3rd century CE, is still followed. Adhering closely to the Pharisaic interpretations of Bible texts, he endeavored not only to elucidate many passages, but also to determine certain dates which are not indicated in the Bible, but which may be inferred by calculation. He also recognized the importance of the Jubilee and Sabbatical cycles as a long-term calendrical system, and attempted at various places to fit the Sabbatical and Jubilee years into its chronological scheme.

In many cases, however, he gave the dates according to tradition, and inserted, besides, the sayings and halakhot of preceding rabbis and of his contemporaries. In discussing biblical chronology he followed three principles:

1. To assume that the intention of the biblical author was, wherever possible, to give exact dates
2. To assign to each of a series of events the shortest possible duration of time, where necessary, in order to secure agreement with the biblical text
3. To adopt the lesser of two possible numbers.

== Chronology ==
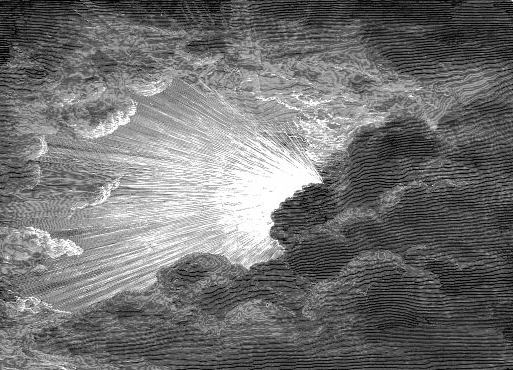
The Jewish calendar's reference point is traditionally considered to be about one year before the creation of the world.

The current Hebrew calendar year numbering system, which counts years from the creation, has been in use for more than 1000 years. The dating system of numbering the years from creation was adopted sometime before 3925 Anno Mundi (165 CE), and based on the calculation of Rabbi Yose ben Halafta during about 160 CE in the book Seder Olam Rabbah.

These years are based on the computations of dates and periods found in the Hebrew Bible. In Jewish tradition, "Year 1" is considered to have begun on the 25 of Elul, 5 days before the beginning of "Year 2" on the first of Tishrei, when Adam was created. The new moon of its first month (Tishrei) is designated molad tohu (meaning new moon of chaos or nothing). By Halafta's calculation Adam was created during the year 3761 BCE. However, Seder Olam Rabbah treats the creation of Adam as the beginning of "Year Zero". This results in a two-year discrepancy between the years given in Seder Olam Rabbah and the Jewish year used now. For example, Seder Olam Rabbah gives the year of the Exodus from Egypt as 2448 AM; but, according to the current system, the year would be 2450 AM.

Despite the computations by Yose ben Halafta, confusion persisted for a long time as to how the calculations should be applied. During 1000, for example, the Muslim chronologist al-Biruni noted that three different epochs were used by various Jewish communities being one, two, or three years later than the modern epoch. The epoch seems to have been settled by 1178, when Maimonides, in his work Mishneh Torah, described all of the modern rules of the Hebrew calendar, including the modern epochal year. His work has been accepted by Jews as definitive, though it does not correspond to the scientific calculations. For example, the Jewish year for the destruction of the First Temple has traditionally been given as 3338 AM or 423/2 BC. This differs from the modern scientific year, which is usually expressed using the Proleptic Julian calendar as 587 BC. The scientific date takes into account evidence from the ancient Babylonian calendar and its astronomical observations. So, too, according to Jewish computation, the destruction of the Second Temple occurred in the lunar month of Av in anno 68 CE, rather than in 70 CE. In this and related cases, a difference between the traditional Jewish year and a scientific date in a Gregorian year or in a proleptic Julian calendar date results from a disagreement about when the event happened—and not simply a difference between the Jewish and Gregorian calendars (see the "Missing Years" in the Jewish Calendar and below, Excursus: Jewish Chronology in the Scroll of Antiochus).

In Jewish thought the counting is usually considered to be from the creation of the world, as has been emphasized in many ancient texts dealing with creation chronology, viz. that the six days of creation till man are literal days—including the days before the creation of the sun and earth. However, some understand these days metaphorically.

=== Genesis to the period of the Judges ===
According to Genesis, the confusion of languages took place in the days of Peleg. Seder Olam attempts to identify when exactly in Peleg's life this occurred. It concludes that the first year of Peleg's life cannot be meant (as at the time of the confusion Peleg had a younger brother, Joktan, who had several children); nor could it have occurred during the middle years of his life (for the designation "middle years" is not an exact one; had the Bible intended to indicate only a general period, it would have used the phrase "in the days of Peleg and Joktan"). The Bible must therefore mean that the confusion of languages took place in the last year of Peleg's life, which (based on the dates of the previous generations in Genesis) occurred 340 years after the Flood, or 1996 years after the creation of the world.

After dealing in the first 10 chapters with the chronology of the period from the creation of the world to the death of Moses, the writer proceeds to determine the dates of the events which occurred after the Israelites, led by Joshua, entered the Holy Land. Here biblical chronology presents many difficulties, dates not being clearly given, and in many cases Seder Olam was used by later biblical commentators as a basis of exegesis. It is known that from the entry of the Israelites into the Holy Land to the time of Jephthah a period of 300 years elapsed. By computing the life periods of the Judges and assuming that Jephthah sent his message (alluding to the 300 years) in the second year of his rule, Seder Olam concludes that the reign of Joshua lasted 28 years. The work places two events in the Book of Judges whose date is unclear (the making of the image for Micah and Battle of Gibeah episode) in the time of Othniel.

I Kings states that Solomon began to build the Temple in Jerusalem in the fourth year of his reign, 480 years after the Exodus, that is, 440 years after the Israelites entered the Holy Land. Thus 140 years passed from the second year of Jephthah to the building of the Temple. Seder Olam concludes that the forty years during which the Israelites were harassed by the Philistines did not begin after the death of Abdon, as it would seem, but after that of Jephthah, and terminated with the death of Samson. Consequently, there was a period of 83 years from the second year of Jephthah to the death of Eli, who ruled 40 years, the last year of Samson being the first of Eli's judgeship. At that time the Tabernacle was removed from Shiloh, whither it had been transferred from Gilgal, where it had been for 14 years under Joshua; consequently it remained at Shiloh for a period of 369 years, standing all that time on a stone foundation. It is also to be concluded that Samuel judged Israel for 11 years, which with the two years of Saul, the 40 of David's reign, and the four of Solomon's reign, make 57 years, during which the Tabernacle was first at Nob, then at Gibeon.

=== Period of the monarchy ===
The chronology of the Kings was more difficult, as there were differences to reconcile between the book of Kings and book of Chronicles. Here especially the author applied the principle of "fragments of years" ("shanim mekutta'ot"), by which he regarded the remainder of the last year of any king's reign as identical with the first year of his successor's. In chapter 20, which closes the second part ("Baba Meẓia"), the author deals with the forty-eight prophets that flourished in the land of Israel. Beginning with Joshua, the author reviews the whole prophetic period which terminated with Haggai, Zechariah, and Malachi, elucidating as he proceeds many obscure points. Thus, the prophet mentioned in Judges 6:8 was, according to Seder Olam, Phinehas, and the man of God that came to Eli was Elkanah.

According to Seder Olam, the prophecy of Obadiah occurred in the time of Amaziah and those of Joel, Nahum, and Habakkuk in the reign of Manasseh. After devoting the 21st chapter to the prophets that lived before the conquest of the land, to the seven prophetesses, and to the seven prophets of the Gentiles, Seder Olam resumes the chronology of the Kings. This continues until the end of chapter 27, where it is calculated that the destruction of the Temple occurred after it had existed 410 years, or 3,338 years after the creation of the world.

Several vital clues are provided by the 2nd-century authors of Seder Olam and the Tosefta, as to the placement of events in relation to the Jubilee and seven year cycle. Although no dates are provided in ancient records, general time-frames for certain events are provided by an inference to their relation to either the First Temple's building or to the First Temple's destruction, and which Temple is said to have stood 410 years. Since, according to Jewish oral tradition, the destruction of the First Temple occurred in 422 BCE, a year which also corresponded to the 1st-year of the seven-year cycle, scholars have sought to plot all events described in the Hebrew Scriptures based on these reference points. Other references include such facts (as brought down in Seder Olam) that the 11th-year of Solomon's reign, when he completed his building of the First Temple, was in the 4th-year of the seven-year cycle, or, similarly, that Jehoiachin's exile began 25 years before the next Jubilee and during the fourth year of a Sabbatical year, or that the 18th-year of Josiah's reign was the year of Jubilee, and that the 14th-year after the First Temple's destruction was also a Jubilee.

Moreover, the interval between the First Temple's destruction in 422 BCE and the Second Temple's destruction in 68 CE is put at 490 years.

In the Jewish custom of recollecting regnal years of kings, the 1st day of the lunar month Nisan marks a New Year for kings, meaning, from this date was calculated the years of the reign of Israelite kings; thus if a king was enthroned in the preceding month, Adar, he begins his second year of reign in the next lunar month, following the 1st of Nisan. Based on this unique way of reckoning regnal years, if King X died in the lunar month Nisan in the year 2022, and King XX succeeded him on the throne in Nisan of 2022, both kings are reckoned as having reigned one year in 2022. All dates provided in the following table showing King David's line of succession are, therefore, made subject to this caveat.

Seder Olam's delineation of David's dynasty (click to open)

Seder Olam's delineation of David's dynasty (based on RAVAD's calculations)
| Event | Anno BCE | Seven Year Cycle / Jubilee |
|---|---|---|
| David becomes king of Judah, after the death of King Saul. Reigned 40 years. | 896 BCE | 5th-year of seven-year cycle |
| | 895 BCE | 6th-year of seven-year cycle |
| | 894 BCE | Sabbatical year |
| | 893 BCE | 1st-year of seven-year cycle |
| | 892 BCE | 2nd-year of seven-year cycle |
| | 891 BCE | 3rd-year of seven-year cycle |
| | 890 BCE | 4th-year of seven-year cycle |
| | 889 BCE | 5th-year of seven-year cycle |
| Eighth year of David's reign. David moves to Jerusalem and begins to reign over all the tribes of Israel. | 888 BCE | 6th-year of seven-year cycle |
| | 887 BCE | Sabbatical year |
| | 886 BCE | 1st-year of seven-year cycle |
| | 885 BCE | 2nd-year of seven-year cycle |
| | 884 BCE | 3rd-year of seven-year cycle |
| | 883 BCE | 4th-year of seven-year cycle |
| | 882 BCE | 5th-year of seven-year cycle |
| | 881 BCE | 6th-year of seven-year cycle |
| | 880 BCE | Sabbatical year |
| | 879 BCE | 1st-year of seven-year cycle |
| | 878 BCE | 2nd-year of seven-year cycle |
| | 877 BCE | 3rd-year of seven-year cycle |
| | 876 BCE | 4th-year of seven-year cycle |
| | 875 BCE | 5th-year of seven-year cycle |
| | 874 BCE | 6th-year of seven-year cycle |
| | 873 BCE | Sabbatical year |
| | 872 BCE | 1st-year of seven-year cycle |
| | 871 BCE | 2nd-year of seven-year cycle |
| | 870 BCE | 3rd-year of seven-year cycle |
| | 869 BCE | 4th-year of seven-year cycle |
| | 868 BCE | 5th-year of seven-year cycle |
| | 867 BCE | 6th-year of seven-year cycle |
| | 866 BCE | Sabbatical year |
| | 865 BCE | 1st-year of seven-year cycle |
| | 864 BCE | 2nd-year of seven-year cycle |
| | 863 BCE | 3rd-year of seven-year cycle |
| | 862 BCE | 4th-year of seven-year cycle |
| | 861 BCE | 5th-year of seven-year cycle |
| | 860 BCE | 6th-year of seven-year cycle |
| | 859 BCE | Sabbatical year |
| | 858 BCE | Jubilee |
| | 857 BCE | 1st-year of seven-year cycle |
| Solomon ascends the throne of Judah. Reigned 40 years. | 856 BCE | 2nd-year of seven-year cycle |
| | 855 BCE | 3rd-year of seven-year cycle |
| | 854 BCE | 4th-year of seven-year cycle |
| | 853 BCE | 5th-year of seven-year cycle |
| Solomon lays the foundation of the Temple in the 4th year of his reign. Solomon marries the daughter of Pharaoh. | 852 BCE | 6th-year of seven-year cycle |
| | 851 BCE | Sabbatical year |
| | 850 BCE | 1st-year of seven-year cycle |
| | 849 BCE | 2nd-year of seven-year cycle |
| | 848 BCE | 3rd-year of seven-year cycle |
| | 847 BCE | 4th-year of seven-year cycle |
| | 846 BCE | 5th-year of seven-year cycle |
| Year marks the 11th-year of Solomon's reign. First Temple completed. (Ravad, deviating from the tradition held in the Tosefta (Zevahim 13:6), wrote that the First Temple stood 427 [sic] years [424 years], namely, from 846/845 BCE to 422 BCE) | 845 BCE | 6th-year of seven-year cycle |
| | 844 BCE | Sabbatical year |
| | 843 BCE | 1st-year of seven-year cycle |
| | 842 BCE | 2nd-year of seven-year cycle |
| | 841 BCE | 3rd-year of seven-year cycle |
| | 840 BCE | 4th-year of seven-year cycle |
| | 839 BCE | 5th-year of seven-year cycle |
| | 838 BCE | 6th-year of seven-year cycle |
| | 837 BCE | Sabbatical year |
| | 836 BCE | 1st-year of seven-year cycle |
| | 835 BCE | 2nd-year of seven-year cycle |
| | 834 BCE | 3rd-year of seven-year cycle |
| | 833 BCE | 4th-year of seven-year cycle |
| | 832 BCE | 5th-year of seven-year cycle |
| | 831 BCE | 6th-year of seven-year cycle |
| | 830 BCE | Sabbatical year |
| | 829 BCE | 1st-year of seven-year cycle |
| | 828 BCE | 2nd-year of seven-year cycle |
| | 827 BCE | 3rd-year of seven-year cycle |
| | 826 BCE | 4th-year of seven-year cycle |
| | 825 BCE | 5th-year of seven-year cycle |
| | 824 BCE | 6th-year of seven-year cycle |
| | 823 BCE | Sabbatical year |
| | 822 BCE | 1st-year of seven-year cycle |
| | 821 BCE | 2nd-year of seven-year cycle |
| | 820 BCE | 3rd-year of seven-year cycle |
| | 819 BCE | 4th-year of seven-year cycle |
| | 818 BCE | 5th-year of seven-year cycle |
| | 817 BCE | 6th-year of seven-year cycle |
| Rehoboam begins reign over Judah. Reigned 17 years. | 816 BCE | Sabbatical year |
| | 815 BCE | 1st-year of seven-year cycle |
| | 814 BCE | 2nd-year of seven-year cycle |
| | 813 BCE | 3rd-year of seven-year cycle |
| | 812 BCE | 4th-year of seven-year cycle |
| Shishak, king of Egypt, invades Judah. | 811 BCE | 5th-year of seven-year cycle |
| | 810 BCE | 6th-year of seven-year cycle |
| | 809 BCE | Sabbatical year |
| | 808 BCE | Jubilee |
| | 807 BCE | 1st-year of seven-year cycle |
| | 806 BCE | 2nd-year of seven-year cycle |
| | 805 BCE | 3rd-year of seven-year cycle |
| | 804 BCE | 4th-year of seven-year cycle |
| | 803 BCE | 5th-year of seven-year cycle |
| | 802 BCE | 6th-year of seven-year cycle |
| | 801 BCE | Sabbatical year |
| | 800 BCE | 1st-year of seven-year cycle |
| Abijah (also called Abiam) begins reign over Judah. Reigned 3 years. | 799 BCE | 2nd-year of seven-year cycle |
| | 798 BCE | 3rd-year of seven-year cycle |
| | 797 BCE | 4th-year of seven-year cycle |
| Asa begins his rule over Judah. Reigned 41 years. | 796 BCE | 5th-year of seven-year cycle |
| | 795 BCE | 6th-year of seven-year cycle |
| | 794 BCE | Sabbatical year |
| | 793 BCE | 1st-year of seven-year cycle |
| | 792 BCE | 2nd-year of seven-year cycle |
| | 791 BCE | 3rd-year of seven-year cycle |
| | 790 BCE | 4th-year of seven-year cycle |
| | 789 BCE | 5th-year of seven-year cycle |
| | 788 BCE | 6th-year of seven-year cycle |
| | 787 BCE | Sabbatical year |
| | 786 BCE | 1st-year of seven-year cycle |
| | 785 BCE | 2nd-year of seven-year cycle |
| | 784 BCE | 3rd-year of seven-year cycle |
| | 783 BCE | 4th-year of seven-year cycle |
| | 782 BCE | 5th-year of seven-year cycle |
| | 781 BCE | 6th-year of seven-year cycle |
| | 780 BCE | Sabbatical year |
| | 779 BCE | 1st-year of seven-year cycle |
| | 778 BCE | 2nd-year of seven-year cycle |
| | 777 BCE | 3rd-year of seven-year cycle |
| | 776 BCE | 4th-year of seven-year cycle |
| | 775 BCE | 5th-year of seven-year cycle |
| | 774 BCE | 6th-year of seven-year cycle |
| | 773 BCE | Sabbatical year |
| | 772 BCE | 1st-year of seven-year cycle |
| | 771 BCE | 2nd-year of seven-year cycle |
| | 770 BCE | 3rd-year of seven-year cycle |
| | 769 BCE | 4th-year of seven-year cycle |
| | 768 BCE | 5th-year of seven-year cycle |
| | 767 BCE | 6th-year of seven-year cycle |
| | 766 BCE | Sabbatical year |
| | 765 BCE | 1st-year of seven-year cycle |
| | 764 BCE | 2nd-year of seven-year cycle |
| | 763 BCE | 3rd-year of seven-year cycle |
| | 762 BCE | 4th-year of seven-year cycle |
| | 761 BCE | 5th-year of seven-year cycle |
| | 760 BCE | 6th-year of seven-year cycle |
| | 759 BCE | Sabbatical year |
| | 758 BCE | Jubilee |
| | 757 BCE | 1st-year of seven-year cycle |
| | 756 BCE | 2nd-year of seven-year cycle |
| Jehoshaphat becomes king of Judah. Reigned 25 years. | 755 BCE | 3rd-year of seven-year cycle |
| | 754 BCE | 4th-year of seven-year cycle |
| | 753 BCE | 5th-year of seven-year cycle |
| | 752 BCE | 6th-year of seven-year cycle |
| | 751 BCE | Sabbatical year |
| | 750 BCE | 1st-year of seven-year cycle |
| | 749 BCE | 2nd-year of seven-year cycle |
| | 748 BCE | 3rd-year of seven-year cycle |
| | 747 BCE | 4th-year of seven-year cycle |
| | 746 BCE | 5th-year of seven-year cycle |
| | 745 BCE | 6th-year of seven-year cycle |
| | 744 BCE | Sabbatical year |
| | 743 BCE | 1st-year of seven-year cycle |
| | 742 BCE | 2nd-year of seven-year cycle |
| | 741 BCE | 3rd-year of seven-year cycle |
| | 740 BCE | 4th-year of seven-year cycle |
| | 739 BCE | 5th-year of seven-year cycle |
| | 738 BCE | 6th-year of seven-year cycle |
| | 737 BCE | Sabbatical year |
| | 736 BCE | 1st-year of seven-year cycle |
| | 735 BCE | 2nd-year of seven-year cycle |
| | 734 BCE | 3rd-year of seven-year cycle |
| | 733 BCE | 4th-year of seven-year cycle |
| | 732 BCE | 5th-year of seven-year cycle |
| | 731 BCE | 6th-year of seven-year cycle |
| Jehoram made king over Judah. Reigned 8 years. | 730 BCE | Sabbatical year |
| | 729 BCE | 1st-year of seven-year cycle |
| | 728 BCE | 2nd-year of seven-year cycle |
| | 727 BCE | 3rd-year of seven-year cycle |
| | 726 BCE | 4th-year of seven-year cycle |
| | 725 BCE | 5th-year of seven-year cycle |
| | 724 BCE | 6th-year of seven-year cycle |
| | 723 BCE | Sabbatical year |
| Ahaziah made king over Judah. Reigned 1 year. | 722 BCE | 1st-year of seven-year cycle |
| Athaliah usurps authority as queen over Judah. Reigned 6 years. | 721 BCE | 2nd-year of seven-year cycle |
| | 720 BCE | 3rd-year of seven-year cycle |
| | 719 BCE | 4th-year of seven-year cycle |
| | 718 BCE | 5th-year of seven-year cycle |
| | 717 BCE | 6th-year of seven-year cycle |
| | 716 BCE | Sabbatical year |
| Jehoash made king of Judah. Reigned 40 years. | 715 BCE | 1st-year of seven-year cycle |
| | 714 BCE | 2nd-year of seven-year cycle |
| | 713 BCE | 3rd-year of seven-year cycle |
| | 712 BCE | 4th-year of seven-year cycle |
| | 711 BCE | 5th-year of seven-year cycle |
| | 710 BCE | 6th-year of seven-year cycle |
| | 709 BCE | Sabbatical year |
| | 708 BCE | Jubilee |
| | 707 BCE | 1st-year of seven-year cycle |
| | 706 BCE | 2nd-year of seven-year cycle |
| | 705 BCE | 3rd-year of seven-year cycle |
| | 704 BCE | 4th-year of seven-year cycle |
| | 703 BCE | 5th-year of seven-year cycle |
| | 702 BCE | 6th-year of seven-year cycle |
| | 701 BCE | Sabbatical year |
| | 700 BCE | 1st-year of seven-year cycle |
| | 699 BCE | 2nd-year of seven-year cycle |
| | 698 BCE | 3rd-year of seven-year cycle |
| | 697 BCE | 4th-year of seven-year cycle |
| | 696 BCE | 5th-year of seven-year cycle |
| | 695 BCE | 6th-year of seven-year cycle |
| | 694 BCE | Sabbatical year |
| | 693 BCE | 1st-year of seven-year cycle |
| Year marks 23rd year of Jehoash's reign. During this year, he refurbished the Temple, which year fell out 155 [sic] [154] years after Solomon completed the Temple (in 846/845 BCE). | 692 BCE | 2nd-year of seven-year cycle |
| | 691 BCE | 3rd-year of seven-year cycle |
| | 690 BCE | 4th-year of seven-year cycle |
| | 689 BCE | 5th-year of seven-year cycle |
| | 688 BCE | 6th-year of seven-year cycle |
| | 687 BCE | Sabbatical year |
| | 686 BCE | 1st-year of seven-year cycle |
| | 685 BCE | 2nd-year of seven-year cycle |
| | 684 BCE | 3rd-year of seven-year cycle |
| | 683 BCE | 4th-year of seven-year cycle |
| | 682 BCE | 5th-year of seven-year cycle |
| | 681 BCE | 6th-year of seven-year cycle |
| | 680 BCE | Sabbatical year |
| | 679 BCE | 1st-year of seven-year cycle |
| | 678 BCE | 2nd-year of seven-year cycle |
| | 677 BCE | 3rd-year of seven-year cycle |
| | 676 BCE | 4th-year of seven-year cycle |
| Amaziah begins to reign over Judah. Reigned 29 years. | 675 BCE | 5th-year of seven-year cycle |
| | 674 BCE | 6th-year of seven-year cycle |
| | 673 BCE | Sabbatical year |
| | 672 BCE | 1st-year of seven-year cycle |
| | 671 BCE | 2nd-year of seven-year cycle |
| | 670 BCE | 3rd-year of seven-year cycle |
| | 669 BCE | 4th-year of seven-year cycle |
| | 668 BCE | 5th-year of seven-year cycle |
| | 667 BCE | 6th-year of seven-year cycle |
| | 666 BCE | Sabbatical year |
| | 665 BCE | 1st-year of seven-year cycle |
| | 664 BCE | 2nd-year of seven-year cycle |
| | 663 BCE | 3rd-year of seven-year cycle |
| | 662 BCE | 4th-year of seven-year cycle |
| | 661 BCE | 5th-year of seven-year cycle |
| | 660 BCE | 6th-year of seven-year cycle |
| | 659 BCE | Sabbatical year |
| | 658 BCE | Jubilee |
| | 657 BCE | 1st-year of seven-year cycle |
| | 656 BCE | 2nd-year of seven-year cycle |
| | 655 BCE | 3rd-year of seven-year cycle |
| | 654 BCE | 4th-year of seven-year cycle |
| | 653 BCE | 5th-year of seven-year cycle |
| | 652 BCE | 6th-year of seven-year cycle |
| | 651 BCE | Sabbatical year |
| | 650 BCE | 1st-year of seven-year cycle |
| | 649 BCE | 2nd-year of seven-year cycle |
| | 648 BCE | 3rd-year of seven-year cycle |
| | 647 BCE | 4th-year of seven-year cycle |
| Azariah, also called Uzziah, begins to reign over Judah. Reigned 52 years. | 646 BCE | 5th-year of seven-year cycle |
| | 645 BCE | 6th-year of seven-year cycle |
| | 644 BCE | Sabbatical year |
| | 643 BCE | 1st-year of seven-year cycle |
| | 642 BCE | 2nd-year of seven-year cycle |
| | 641 BCE | 3rd-year of seven-year cycle |
| | 640 BCE | 4th-year of seven-year cycle |
| | 639 BCE | 5th-year of seven-year cycle |
| | 638 BCE | 6th-year of seven-year cycle |
| | 637 BCE | Sabbatical year |
| | 636 BCE | 1st-year of seven-year cycle |
| | 635 BCE | 2nd-year of seven-year cycle |
| | 634 BCE | 3rd-year of seven-year cycle |
| | 633 BCE | 4th-year of seven-year cycle |
| | 632 BCE | 5th-year of seven-year cycle |
| | 631 BCE | 6th-year of seven-year cycle |
| | 630 BCE | Sabbatical year |
| | 629 BCE | 1st-year of seven-year cycle |
| | 628 BCE | 2nd-year of seven-year cycle |
| | 627 BCE | 3rd-year of seven-year cycle |
| | 626 BCE | 4th-year of seven-year cycle |
| | 625 BCE | 5th-year of seven-year cycle |
| | 624 BCE | 6th-year of seven-year cycle |
| | 623 BCE | Sabbatical year |
| | 622 BCE | 1st-year of seven-year cycle |
| | 621 BCE | 2nd-year of seven-year cycle |
| | 620 BCE | 3rd-year of seven-year cycle |
| | 619 BCE | 4th-year of seven-year cycle |
| | 618 BCE | 5th-year of seven-year cycle |
| | 617 BCE | 6th-year of seven-year cycle |
| | 616 BCE | Sabbatical year |
| | 615 BCE | 1st-year of seven-year cycle |
| | 614 BCE | 2nd-year of seven-year cycle |
| | 613 BCE | 3rd-year of seven-year cycle |
| | 612 BCE | 4th-year of seven-year cycle |
| | 611 BCE | 5th-year of seven-year cycle |
| | 610 BCE | 6th-year of seven-year cycle |
| | 609 BCE | Sabbatical year |
| | 608 BCE | Jubilee |
| | 607 BCE | 1st-year of seven-year cycle |
| | 606 BCE | 2nd-year of seven-year cycle |
| | 605 BCE | 3rd-year of seven-year cycle |
| | 604 BCE | 4th-year of seven-year cycle |
| | 603 BCE | 5th-year of seven-year cycle |
| | 602 BCE | 6th-year of seven-year cycle |
| | 601 BCE | Sabbatical year |
| | 600 BCE | 1st-year of seven-year cycle |
| | 599 BCE | 2nd-year of seven-year cycle |
| | 598 BCE | 3rd-year of seven-year cycle |
| | 597 BCE | 4th-year of seven-year cycle |
| | 596 BCE | 5th-year of seven-year cycle |
| | 595 BCE | 6th-year of seven-year cycle |
| Jotham begins to reign over Judah. Reigned 16 years. | 594 BCE | Sabbatical year |
| | 593 BCE | 1st-year of seven-year cycle |
| | 592 BCE | 2nd-year of seven-year cycle |
| | 591 BCE | 3rd-year of seven-year cycle |
| | 590 BCE | 4th-year of seven-year cycle |
| | 589 BCE | 5th-year of seven-year cycle |
| | 588 BCE | 6th-year of seven-year cycle |
| | 587 BCE | Sabbatical year |
| | 586 BCE | 1st-year of seven-year cycle |
| | 585 BCE | 2nd-year of seven-year cycle |
| | 584 BCE | 3rd-year of seven-year cycle |
| | 583 BCE | 4th-year of seven-year cycle |
| | 582 BCE | 5th-year of seven-year cycle |
| | 581 BCE | 6th-year of seven-year cycle |
| | 580 BCE | Sabbatical year |
| | 579 BCE | 1st-year of seven-year cycle |
| Ahaz becomes the king of Judah. Reigned 16 years. | 578 BCE | 2nd-year of seven-year cycle |
| | 577 BCE | 3rd-year of seven-year cycle |
| | 576 BCE | 4th-year of seven-year cycle |
| | 575 BCE | 5th-year of seven-year cycle |
| | 574 BCE | 6th-year of seven-year cycle |
| | 573 BCE | Sabbatical year |
| | 572 BCE | 1st-year of seven-year cycle |
| | 571 BCE | 2nd-year of seven-year cycle |
| | 570 BCE | 3rd-year of seven-year cycle |
| | 569 BCE | 4th-year of seven-year cycle |
| | 568 BCE | 5th-year of seven-year cycle |
| | 567 BCE | 6th-year of seven-year cycle |
| | 566 BCE | Sabbatical year |
| | 565 BCE | 1st-year of seven-year cycle |
| | 564 BCE | 2nd-year of seven-year cycle |
| | 563 BCE | 3rd-year of seven-year cycle |
| Hezekiah is made the king of Judah. Reigned 29 years. | 562 BCE | 4th-year of seven-year cycle |
| | 561 BCE | 5th-year of seven-year cycle |
| | 560 BCE | 6th-year of seven-year cycle |
| | 559 BCE | Sabbatical year |
| Shalmaneser lays siege to Samaria | 558 BCE | Jubilee |
| | 557 BCE | 1st-year of seven-year cycle |
| Year marks the 6th year of Hezekiah's reign, when Shalmaneser captured Samaria and exiled the northern kingdom of Israel and brought them into Assyria. | 556 BCE | 2nd-year of seven-year cycle |
| | 555 BCE | 3rd-year of seven-year cycle |
| | 554 BCE | 4th-year of seven-year cycle |
| | 553 BCE | 5th-year of seven-year cycle |
| | 552 BCE | 6th-year of seven-year cycle |
| | 551 BCE | Sabbatical year |
| | 550 BCE | 1st-year of seven-year cycle |
| | 549 BCE | 2nd-year of seven-year cycle |
| Year marks the 14th year of Hezekiah's reign, when Sennacherib captured the fortified cities of Judah. | 548 BCE | 3rd-year of seven-year cycle |
| | 547 BCE | 4th-year of seven-year cycle |
| | 546 BCE | 5th-year of seven-year cycle |
| | 545 BCE | 6th-year of seven-year cycle |
| | 544 BCE | Sabbatical year |
| | 543 BCE | 1st-year of seven-year cycle |
| | 542 BCE | 2nd-year of seven-year cycle |
| | 541 BCE | 3rd-year of seven-year cycle |
| | 540 BCE | 4th-year of seven-year cycle |
| | 539 BCE | 5th-year of seven-year cycle |
| | 538 BCE | 6th-year of seven-year cycle |
| | 537 BCE | Sabbatical year |
| | 536 BCE | 1st-year of seven-year cycle |
| | 535 BCE | 2nd-year of seven-year cycle |
| | 534 BCE | 3rd-year of seven-year cycle |
| Manasseh is made the king of Judah. Reigned 55 years. | 533 BCE | 4th-year of seven-year cycle |
| | 532 BCE | 5th-year of seven-year cycle |
| | 531 BCE | 6th-year of seven-year cycle |
| | 530 BCE | Sabbatical year |
| | 529 BCE | 1st-year of seven-year cycle |
| | 528 BCE | 2nd-year of seven-year cycle |
| | 527 BCE | 3rd-year of seven-year cycle |
| | 526 BCE | 4th-year of seven-year cycle |
| | 525 BCE | 5th-year of seven-year cycle |
| | 524 BCE | 6th-year of seven-year cycle |
| | 523 BCE | Sabbatical year |
| | 522 BCE | 1st-year of seven-year cycle |
| | 521 BCE | 2nd-year of seven-year cycle |
| | 520 BCE | 3rd-year of seven-year cycle |
| | 519 BCE | 4th-year of seven-year cycle |
| | 518 BCE | 5th-year of seven-year cycle |
| | 517 BCE | 6th-year of seven-year cycle |
| | 516 BCE | Sabbatical year |
| | 515 BCE | 1st-year of seven-year cycle |
| | 514 BCE | 2nd-year of seven-year cycle |
| | 513 BCE | 3rd-year of seven-year cycle |
| | 512 BCE | 4th-year of seven-year cycle |
| | 511 BCE | 5th-year of seven-year cycle |
| | 510 BCE | 6th-year of seven-year cycle |
| | 509 BCE | Sabbatical year |
| | 508 BCE | Jubilee |
| | 507 BCE | 1st-year of seven-year cycle |
| | 506 BCE | 2nd-year of seven-year cycle |
| | 505 BCE | 3rd-year of seven-year cycle |
| | 504 BCE | 4th-year of seven-year cycle |
| | 503 BCE | 5th-year of seven-year cycle |
| | 502 BCE | 6th-year of seven-year cycle |
| | 501 BCE | Sabbatical year |
| | 500 BCE | 1st-year of seven-year cycle |
| | 499 BCE | 2nd-year of seven-year cycle |
| | 498 BCE | 3rd-year of seven-year cycle |
| | 497 BCE | 4th-year of seven-year cycle |
| | 496 BCE | 5th-year of seven-year cycle |
| | 495 BCE | 6th-year of seven-year cycle |
| | 494 BCE | Sabbatical year |
| | 493 BCE | 1st-year of seven-year cycle |
| | 492 BCE | 2nd-year of seven-year cycle |
| | 491 BCE | 3rd-year of seven-year cycle |
| | 490 BCE | 4th-year of seven-year cycle |
| | 489 BCE | 5th-year of seven-year cycle |
| | 488 BCE | 6th-year of seven-year cycle |
| | 487 BCE | Sabbatical year |
| | 486 BCE | 1st-year of seven-year cycle |
| | 485 BCE | 2nd-year of seven-year cycle |
| | 484 BCE | 3rd-year of seven-year cycle |
| | 483 BCE | 4th-year of seven-year cycle |
| | 482 BCE | 5th-year of seven-year cycle |
| | 481 BCE | 6th-year of seven-year cycle |
| | 480 BCE | Sabbatical year |
| | 479 BCE | 1st-year of seven-year cycle |
| Amon becomes king of Judah. Reigned 2 years. | 478 BCE | 2nd-year of seven-year cycle |
| | 477 BCE | 3rd-year of seven-year cycle |
| Josiah begins to reign over Judah. Reigned 31 years. | 476 BCE | 4th-year of seven-year cycle |
| | 475 BCE | 5th-year of seven-year cycle |
| | 474 BCE | 6th-year of seven-year cycle |
| | 473 BCE | Sabbatical year |
| | 472 BCE | 1st-year of seven-year cycle |
| | 471 BCE | 2nd-year of seven-year cycle |
| | 470 BCE | 3rd-year of seven-year cycle |
| | 469 BCE | 4th-year of seven-year cycle |
| | 468 BCE | 5th-year of seven-year cycle |
| | 467 BCE | 6th-year of seven-year cycle |
| | 466 BCE | Sabbatical year |
| | 465 BCE | 1st-year of seven-year cycle |
| | 464 BCE | 2nd-year of seven-year cycle |
| | 463 BCE | 3rd-year of seven-year cycle |
| | 462 BCE | 4th-year of seven-year cycle |
| | 461 BCE | 5th-year of seven-year cycle |
| | 460 BCE | 6th-year of seven-year cycle |
| | 459 BCE | Sabbatical year |
| Year marks the 18th-year of Josiah's reign, mentioned in Seder Olam as a year of Jubilee. During this same year, a Torah scroll was found in the Temple and brought to the king. | 458 BCE | Jubilee |
| | 457 BCE | 1st-year of seven-year cycle |
| | 456 BCE | 2nd-year of seven-year cycle |
| | 455 BCE | 3rd-year of seven-year cycle |
| | 454 BCE | 4th-year of seven-year cycle |
| | 453 BCE | 5th-year of seven-year cycle |
| | 452 BCE | 6th-year of seven-year cycle |
| | 451 BCE | Sabbatical year |
| | 450 BCE | 1st-year of seven-year cycle |
| | 449 BCE | 2nd-year of seven-year cycle |
| | 448 BCE | 3rd-year of seven-year cycle |
| | 447 BCE | 4th-year of seven-year cycle |
| | 446 BCE | 5th-year of seven-year cycle |
| | 445 BCE | 6th-year of seven-year cycle |
| Jehoahaz is made king of Judah, but after reigning for 3 months he is deposed by Pharaoh Necho and is taken down to Egypt. Jehoiakim (also known as Eliakim) is made king of Judah. Reigned 11 years. | 444 BCE | Sabbatical year |
| | 443 BCE | 1st-year of seven-year cycle |
| | 442 BCE | 2nd-year of seven-year cycle |
| Year marks the 4th year of Jehoiakim's reign, when Nebuchadnezzar ascended the throne in Babylonia. | 441 BCE | 3rd-year of seven-year cycle |
| Nebuchadnezzar, after defeating the Egyptians, begins to exercise hegemony over Syria, which includes the land of Judah. | 440 BCE | 4th-year of seven-year cycle |
| | 439 BCE | 5th-year of seven-year cycle |
| | 438 BCE | 6th-year of seven-year cycle |
| | 437 BCE | Sabbatical year |
| | 436 BCE | 1st-year of seven-year cycle |
| | 435 BCE | 2nd-year of seven-year cycle |
| | 434 BCE | 3rd-year of seven-year cycle |
| Jehoiachin made king of Judah, but he is deposed after reigning for only 3 months. Zedekiah (formerly called Mataniah) made king of Judah. Reigned 11 years. Year corresponds with 8th- year of Nebuchadnezzar's reign. | 433 BCE | 4th-year of seven-year cycle |
| | 432 BCE | 5th-year of seven-year cycle |
| | 431 BCE | 6th-year of seven-year cycle |
| | 430 BCE | Sabbatical year |
| | 429 BCE | 1st-year of seven-year cycle |
| | 428 BCE | 2nd-year of seven-year cycle |
| | 427 BCE | 3rd-year of seven-year cycle |
| | 426 BCE | 4th-year of seven-year cycle |
| | 425 BCE | 5th-year of seven-year cycle |
| 9th-year of Zedekiah's reign. Nebuchadrezzar lays siege to Jerusalem, because of Zedekiah's rebellion. | 424 BCE | 6th-year of seven-year cycle |
| | 423 BCE | Sabbatical year |
| Destruction of First Temple. Zedekiah's 11th year reign comes to an end. Year marks the city's capture after a siege of 18 months. Year corresponds with 19th-year of Nebuchadnezzar's reign. | 422 BCE | 1st-year of seven-year cycle |
| | 421 BCE | 2nd-year of seven-year cycle |
| | 420 BCE | 3rd-year of seven-year cycle |
| | 419 BCE | 4th-year of seven-year cycle |
| Nebuchadnezzar exiles an additional 745 people from Judah. | 418 BCE | 5th-year of seven-year cycle |
| | 417 BCE | 6th-year of seven-year cycle |
| | 416 BCE | Sabbatical year |
| | 415 BCE | 1st-year of seven-year cycle |
| | 414 BCE | 2nd-year of seven-year cycle |
| | 413 BCE | 3rd-year of seven-year cycle |
| | 412 BCE | 4th-year of seven-year cycle |
| | 411 BCE | 5th-year of seven-year cycle |
| | 410 BCE | 6th-year of seven-year cycle |
| | 409 BCE | Sabbatical year |
| Year marks the 14th-year after the First Temple's destruction, and the 25th year after the people's exile under Jehoiachin. Year also a Jubilee. | 408 BCE | Jubilee |

== The seventy years of exile ==
According to Seder Olam, the 70-year period spoken of by Jeremiah 25:11, Jeremiah 29:10 and Daniel 9:2 began in the first year of Nebuchadnezzar's reign, in 441 BCE, and ended in the year 370 BCE, with the beginning of the return of the exiles under Cyrus.

Aside from the disparity between the traditional Jewish method of dating Nebuchadnezzar's year of ascension (put at 441 BCE) and the conventional method of dating for Nebuchadnezzar's first-year of reign (put at 605 BCE) – a disparity of 164 years, there are also historic discrepancies in the chronological list of successive Babylonian kings mentioned by Seder Olam. Seder Olam's assignment of regnal years for the Babylonian kings in that period differs from those assigned by Berossus the Chaldean for the same period. The major difference being that in Seder Olam's chronology (which teaching is followed by the Babylonian Talmud, Megillah 11b) the seventy-year period was defined by only three Babylonian kings, namely: Nebuchadnezzar who reigned 45 years, Evil-merodach who reigned 23 years and Belshazzar who reigned 3 (for a total of 71 years, with one year deducted), whereas Berossus mentions five Babylonian kings for the same period, and that Nebuchadnezzar reigned only 43 years, followed by Evil-merodach who reigned 2 years, who, in turn, was succeeded by Neriglissar who reigned 4 years, followed by Laborosoarchod who reigned 9 months, and, finally, by Nabonnedus (also known as Belshazzar) who reigned 17 years (for a total of 67 years). It is presumed that the author of Seder Olam had not seen the ancient chronological record of Berossus who lists these five Babylonian kings by name, and that the author of Seder Olam copied only those names of Babylonian kings that he could glean from the Hebrew Scriptures, without any knowledge of the fact that the Hebrew Scriptures had merely mentioned those kings directly related to major events in Jewish history, while omitting the rest. Moreover, the actual number of years given for the kings' individual reigns is not mentioned in the Hebrew Scriptures, and is only had either through the record of Berossus, as transmitted by Josephus, or else by those contradictory figures given in the Talmud.

The Babylonian kings' list in Seder Olam is explained by medieval biblical exegete Saadia Gaon (892–942). In his Judeo-Arabic commentary on the Book of Daniel (9:2), he begins by explaining what is meant by accomplishing "seventy years in the desolation of Jerusalem," saying that this seventy-year period refers not to the destruction of Jerusalem, per se, but rather to the Kingdom of Babylon, in accordance with the biblical verse: "When seventy years are completed for Babylon, I will remember you, and I will fulfill to you my promise and bring you back to this place" (Jeremiah 29:10). Saadia wrote that these seventy years begin with Nebuchadnezzar's ascension to the throne and that he reigned 45 years, and that his son Evil-merodach reigned after him 23 years, and that his son's son after him reigned 3 years, for a total of seventy years. The way in which the rabbis derived 45 years for Nebuchadnezzar's reign was by calculating the beginning of the reign of Evil-merodach which was thought to have been in the 37th year of Jehoiachin's captivity, in accordance with the verse (Jeremiah 52:31): "In the thirty-seventh year of the exile of Jehoiachin king of Judah, in the twelfth month, on the twenty-fifth day of the month, Evil-merodach king of Babylon, in the year of his kingship, he freed Jehoiachin king of Judah and brought him out of prison." The same event is explained in 2 Kings 25:27 as meaning that Jehoiachin was released "in the year that he (Evil-merodach) began to reign" (Hebrew: בשנת מלכו). When Jehoiachin was first exiled in 433 BCE, Nebuchadnezzar king of Babylon had already been in power eight years; (hence: 8 + 37 = 45). At any rate, Evil-merodach is thought by Seder Olam to have begun his reign in 396 BCE, when Jehoiachin was released from his bonds.

Saadia explains, moreover, how Seder Olam derived 23 years, instead of Berossus' 2 years, for Evil-merodach's reign, saying that since the third-year of Belshazzar's reign is referenced in the Scripture and he is thought by the author of Seder Olam to have died in the third-year of his reign, although the Book of Daniel does not say explicitly that Belshazzar died in the third-year of his reign, it stands to reason that the years in between Nebuchadnezzar's 45-year reign and Belshazzar's 3-year reign, at the least, is collected as 23 years, during which time Evil-merodach reigned. The Talmud refers to this as "deductive reasoning" (Hebrew: גמרא). Belshazzar was thought by the author of Seder Olam to be the mere grandson of Nebuchadnezzar, based on the Scripture: "All the nations shall serve him (i.e. Nebuchadnezzar) and his son (i.e. Evil-merodach) and his grandson, etc." (Jeremiah 27:7). Chroniclers have largely rejected Seder Olam's method of assigning regnal years for the Babylonian kings and have relied, instead, on Berossus and on other archaeological records. Still, the 164–165-year disparity between events described in rabbinic tradition and the same events using conventional dating methods has been the subject of intense debate, with Jewish scholars occasionally taking sides.

=== The Persian period ===
According to one Jewish tradition, the seventy-year period of exile commences with the beginning of Nebuchadnezzar's reign, and concludes with the rise of Cyrus the Great who ordered the rebuilding of Jerusalem. Another Jewish tradition avers that it begins with the destruction of Jerusalem in the 19th-year of Nebuchadnezzar's reign, continuing thereafter for another 52 years of desolation, followed by a 19-year Persian period, where Cyrus is alleged to have reigned for 3 years, followed by Ahasuerus who is said to have reigned for 14 years and, finally, Darius, in whose 2nd year of reign the seventy-year period culminated with the rebuilding of Jerusalem. Persia's hegemonic power over the nation of Israel, according to Seder Olam, is said to have extended until the rise of Alexander the Great. Seder Olam names only three Persian kings during this time period, viz.: Cyrus (said to have reigned an additional 3 years after conquering Babylon, and who jointly ruled with Darius the Mede), followed by Ahasuerus (who is said to have reigned 14 years), and, lastly, Darius, who succeeded Ahasuerus, and in whose 2nd-year of reign the foundation of the Second Temple was laid. These three Persian kings, from the end of Israel's exile under the Babylonians until the foundation of the Temple was laid in 356 BCE, spanned a period of 19 years. From the time of the Second Temple's building (in 352 BCE) under the Persians, until the rise of Alexander the Great who put away Persian dominion over Israel, the period is put at 34 years, viz., from 352 BCE to 318 BCE. Some scholars have assumed that the allowance (contrary to historical facts) of only 34 years for the Persian domination is necessary to make the chronology agree with the Pharisaic Talmudical interpretation (of Daniel 9:24), that the second exile was to take place after 70 Sabbaths of years (= 490 years) from an "issuing forth of a word" to rebuild Jerusalem. If from this period of 490 years the 70 years of the first Captivity is deducted, and the beginning of Alexander's control of the Land of Israel is placed (in accordance with Talmudic tradition) at 386 years before the destruction of the Second Temple, then there remain only 34 for the Persian rule.

Alternatively, what seems to be a historical inaccuracy in Seder Olam has been explained in a different way. According to Rashi, the 34-year Persian period is the time span between the building of the Second Temple under Darius in 352 BC (according to Jewish calculations) and Alexander the Great's rise to power in 318 BCE. This time-frame, therefore, does not signify the end of the dynasties in Persia, but rather of their rule and hegemony over Israel before Alexander the Great rose to power. The difficulty besetting this explanation, however, lies in the fact that from Darius I who laid the foundation of the Second Temple to Alexander the Great, who brought an end to Persian hegemony over Israel, there are collected no less than 190 years. This would suggest that the author of Seder Olam confounded Darius I with Darius III Codomannus, the latter Darius being a contemporary with Alexander the Great.

As with the Seder Olam's record of the Babylonian kings, so is there difficulty reconciling the accounts in Seder Olam with historical records that mention successive Persian kings, such as that which was documented by Herodotus, Ptolemy and Manetho, beginning with Cyrus' successor, Cambyses (Artaxerxes) the son of Cyrus (who reigned 5 years), followed by the Magi (who reigned 7 months), followed by Darius the son of Hystaspes (who reigned 36 years), and who, in turn, was succeeded by Xerxes (Artaxerxes) b. Darius (who reigned 21 years). He, in turn, was succeeded by Artabanus (who reigned merely 7 months), followed by Artaxerxes, the son of Xerxes the Great, who reigned 41 years. He is said to have also borne the name Ahasuerus. The year of accession for this last king herein named (Ahasuerus) would have, therefore, been long after the Second Temple had already been built.

Azariah dei Rossi, one of the first to address the discrepancy between Seder Olam's recollection of only three Persian kings (for the period of Persian hegemony over Israel) versus conventional chronology where there were more than 10 Persian kings for the same period, suggests that the Sages of Israel may have chosen to include in their chronology only those years of the period of Persian dominion that were clearly expressed or implied in the Bible.

Seder Olam versus Conventional chronology
| Successive Chaldean rulers | Conventional chronology | Seder Olam's chronology |
|---|---|---|
| Nebuchadnezzar | 43 years | 45 years (Note: According to one Jewish tradition, the seventy-year period of exile commences with the beginning of Nebuchadnezzar's reign, and concludes with the rise of Cyrus the Great who ordered the rebuilding of Jerusalem.) |
| Amel-Marduk | 2 years | 23 years |
| Where conventional chronology goes on to cite another 3 successive Chaldean kings (spanning a period of nearly 22 years), Talmudic chronology cites only one Chaldean king that reigned after Amel-Marduk, namely, Baltasar (co-regent with Nabonidus), and who is said by the Talmudic record to have reigned a mere 3 years. | | |
| Neriglissar | 4 years | --- |
| Labosordacus | 9 months | --- |
| Nabonidus (Baltasar) (Note: Others see Baltasar as Nabonidus' son and co-regent) | [Nabonidus] 17 years (Note: The scholars who deciphered The Babylonian Chronicles (inscribed on tablets) and who analyzed the delineation of years inscribed therein have put the fall of Babylon, in the 17th-year of Nabonidus, in 539 BCE.) | [Baltasar] 3 years (Note: In the Talmud, the name Nabonidus is not mentioned, whereas the presumed succession went from Nebuchadnezzar to his son Amel-Marduk, and from Amel-Marduk to his son Baltasar. Although the full regnal years of the man are not mentioned in the Hebrew Bible, there is, however, a reference in Daniel 8:1 alluding to Baltasar's 3rd-year of reign, including a reference to Baltasar's death in Daniel 5:30–31. According to Rabbeinu Chananel on BT Megillah 11b, the seventy-year period spoken of by Jeremiah (25:11–12; 29:10) and by Daniel (9:1–2) refers to the period of time from the destruction of Jerusalem in the days of Nebuchadnezzar to the 2nd-year of the reign of Darius the Great, the same year being the 3rd and final year of Baltasar's reign.) |
| Total number of years: | 67 years | 71 years |

| Successive Persian rulers | Conventional chronology | Seder Olam's chronology |
|---|---|---|
| Herodotus notes in his Histories that Cyrus the Great reigned 29 years. However, from Cyrus' taking of Babylon in the 17th year of the reign of Nabonidus, only 9 years remained of Cyrus' 29-year reign. This view is corroborated by Ptolemy's Canon. The nine years of Cyrus' reign as mentioned by him only reflect the number of regnal years remaining after Cyrus the Great conquered Babylon in 539 BCE. Cyrus is thought to have died in 530 BCE. | | |
| Cyrus the Great | 29 years (Note: In Parker's and Dubberstein's Babylonian Chronology, 626 B.C.–A.D. 75, p. 14, Cyrus' reign takes up where Nabonidus' reign ends. The nine years given for Cyrus only reflect the number of regnal years remaining after Cyrus the Great conquered Babylon in 539 BCE, bringing an end to Nabonidus' seventeen-year reign. Cyrus is thought to have died in 530 BCE.) | 3 years (Note: The only reference in the Hebrew Bible mentioning the regnal years of Cyrus the Great is found in Daniel 10:1, viz., "In the third year of Cyrus king of Persia, etc." There is no indication as to how long he reigned.) |
| Cambyses (Note: In the Talmud (Megillah 11b), Cambyses is not mentioned, but is replaced by Ahasuerus who is thought to have succeeded Cyrus the Great) | [Cambyses] 7 years and 5 months (Note: Historians differ as to the number of his regnal years. Manetho puts down for this king that he reigned 5 years over his own kingdom in Persia, but 6 years over Egypt. Ptolemy's Canon writes that he reigned 8 years.) | [Ahasuerus] 14 years (Note: The regnal years for this king (14 years according to the Talmud), are not stated explicitly in the Hebrew Bible, and are thought to have only been inferred by the occurrence of four explicit timeframes mentioned in the Scroll of Esther and one that is inexplicit: the first being that Ahasuerus threw a large banqueting feast for his grandees and governors that lasted 180 days during the 3rd year of his reign [Esther 1:3]; the second being that he chose Esther (Hadassah) for his consort during the 7th year of his reign [Esther 2:16]; and the third being that during the 12th year of his reign [Esther 3:7], Haman desired to exterminate the entire Jewish nation and had contrived to commence the killing on a given day of a given month in the following year. On the following year [Esther 9:1], being now the 13th year of Ahasuerus, these orders were rescinded by the king's directives and the Jews found respite. Mordechai is said to have prospered from that time forward, while he and Esther sent out instructions on how the people of Israel were to observe the Purim festival: an allusion to the 14th year.) |
| The Magi | 7 months | --- |
| Darius, the son of Hystaspes | 36 years | 2 years (Note: These two years are only mentioned by the Talmud (Megillah 11b) so as to mark the conclusion of the 70-year period of Jerusalem's destruction, when Darius, during his 2nd-year of reign, laid the foundation for the Second Temple's rebuilding. It does not imply the complete regnal years of Darius' reign.) [36 years] (Note: According to the Talmud (Megillah 11b), this Darius is thought to have been the son of Ahasuerus, based on a verse in Daniel 9:1. Seder Olam erroneously places this Darius as a contemporary with Alexander the Great, and the last of the Persian kings. In conventional chronology, Darius the Great was not the son of Ahasuerus, but rather the son of Hystaspes, and is said to have reigned 36 years, and was succeeded by his son Xerxes. However, in Seder Olam's chronology, Darius is mentioned only with respect to his 2nd-year of reign when he laid the foundation of the Second Temple (356 BCE), a crucial point of reference considering that it is thought to have marked the end of the seventy-year period of Jerusalem's destruction. According to Ezra 6:15, Darius went on to fully complete the Temple in the 6th-year of his reign (352 BCE), but since the entire period of Persian hegemony over Israel during the time of the Second Temple was thought by Seder Olam to have been a mere 34 years (from 352 BCE to 318 BCE), this would imply that Grecian (Macedonian) hegemony over Israel began in 318 BCE, at the conclusion of Darius the Great's reign, or else at the beginning of Xerxes' reign, when the Persian army was defeated by Alexander the Great. Modern scholarship has obviated the clear discrepancy in Seder Olam's chronology by saying that Tannaic scholars confounded Darius the Great with Darius III, and which caused the rabbis to omit ten other successive kings after Darius the Great.) |
| Xerxes (Artaxerxes), the Great, b. Darius (Note: According to Josephus (Antiquities 11.5.1-5), Ezra ascends to the Land of Israel, in 7th year of his reign.) | 21 years | --- |
| Artabanus | 7 months | --- |
| Artaxerxes (Cyrus) b. Xerxes the Great (Ahasuerus) (Note: By some accounts, he is said to have also borne the name Ahasuerus, a contemporary of Esther and Mordecai.) | 41 years | --- |
| Xerxes | 2 months | --- |
| Sogdianus | 7 months | --- |
| Darius, the son of Xerxes | 19 years | --- |
| Artaxerxes II Mnemon (Note: According to Isaac Abarbanel, this ruler is the same as Ahasuerus (אחשורוש), who reigned in the days of Esther and Mordecai. According to Abarbanel, some say that he reigned 14 years, while others say that he reigned 40 years.) | 46 years | --- |
| Artaxerxes III Ochus | 21 years | --- |
| Artaxerxes IV Arses | 2 years | --- |
| Darius III Codomannus | 4 years | --- |
| Total number of years: | 228 years + 4 mo. (Note: Years may vary depending on source used. Most authorities hold that the Persian period in the Land of Israel commenced in the year 539 BCE, and ended in 332 BCE, with Alexander the Great's victory over the Persians. Mitchell First, who puts the Persian period at 207 years, reckons these years from when Cyrus first took Babylon in 539 BCE, rather than from Cyrus' first year of reign.) | 53 years |

=== Second Temple and post-destruction period ===
The narration continues after the 70 years of the Babylonian captivity with the building of the Second Temple which stood 420 years, and which was destroyed, as may be seen, in the year 3828 of the creation. The 420 years of the Second Temple are divided into the following periods: 34 years of Persian rule while the Temple stood; 180 years of the Greeks; 103 years of the Maccabees; 103 years of the Herods. The period of Herodian rule over Israel, namely, 103 years, refers merely to its hegemony over Israel while the Temple was still standing. The beginning of this period is reckoned during Herod the Great's reign in 35 BC and ends in 68 CE with the destruction of the Second Temple (based on Jewish computations).

From the destruction of the Second Temple, which (according to Seder Olam, ch. 30) occurred at the departure of the Sabbatical year (meaning, the beginning of the 1st-year in a seven-year cycle), to the suppression of the Bar Kokhba revolt (or the destruction of Bethar) is given as a period of 52 years. But the text here is very confused and has given rise to various emendations and interpretations, as the historical date for the destruction of the Second Temple is 70 CE and that for the conclusion of the Bar Kochba revolt is 135 CE.

== Authorship ==
Assuming that this Seder Olam is the same as the Seder Olam mentioned in the Talmud, Jewish authorities generally ascribe its authorship to the well-known Talmudist Jose b. Halafta, on the strength of R. Johanan's statement, "The tanna of Seder Olam was R. Jose". Johanan's comment is supported by the fact that Jose was known as one who occupied himself with Jewish chronology; further, many sayings of R. Jose's quoted in the Talmud are paralleled in Seder Olam.

However, Ratner said that Seder Olam often conflicts with Jose's opinions in the Talmud, that it refers to Jose in the third person ("R. Jose said"), and finally it mentions Talmudists who lived later than Jose. For these reasons, he concluded that Jose was not its author; he says that Jose was only the principal authority of Seder Olam, and that Johanan's statement, mentioned above, is similar to another statement he made—"Any anonymous opinion in the Mishnah belongs to Rabbi Meir", although the redactor of the Mishnah was Judah I. Ratner further supposes that R. Johanan himself compiled the work, following generally the opinion of R. Jose. He tries to prove this by showing that many sayings of R. Johanan are taken from Seder Olam.

Other scholars say that in Seder Olam Jose preserved the generally accepted opinions, even when they were contrary to his own, as indicated in Niddah 46b, and that, like all works of the ancient Talmudists, it underwent alternations in copying. Sometimes, finding that the utterance of a later rabbi agreed with Seder Olam, the copyists inserted the name of that rabbi. A careful examination shows that certain additions are later than the latest midrashim, and it may be that Abraham ibn Yarḥi, Isaac Lattes, and Menahem Meïri, who seem to place the redaction of Seder Olam at the time when the Massektot (tractates) Derek Ereẓ Rabbah, the Derek Ereẓ Zuṭa, the Soferim, and other later treatises were composed, may have referred to the work in its present form.

== Usage in later rabbinic texts ==
Besides directly quoting Seder Olam, the Talmud often alludes to it. A passage in Seder Olam (chapter 30) describing the 420 years of four hegemonic powers (Persian, Grecian, Hasmonean and Herodian) appears almost verbatim in the Babylonian Talmud. Often, the phrases "tanya" (= "we learned"), "tana" (= "he learned"), "tanu rabbanan" (= "our teachers learned"), and "amar mar" (= "the teacher said") introduce sentences also found in Seder Olam. In addition, many of its passages have been taken into the Mishnah without any allusion to their source. Seder Olam is not mentioned in the Jerusalem Talmud, although several passages in the latter are based on it. Finally, many of the sayings of Seder Olam have been taken into the Mekhilta, the Sifra, and the Sifre.

Acceptance of Seder Olam Rabbah's chronology was not universal. Among the premodern sources whose chronologies contradict Seder Olam Rabbah are Pirkei deRabbi Eliezer, Josippon, Midrash Lekach Tov, a source quoted by Rashi, Ibn Ezra, Baal HaMaor, Radak, Rashba, Ritva, Ralbag, and Isaac Abarbanel.

== Editions ==
- Seder Olam Rabbah (in print) first appeared at Mantua, in 1514, together with the Seder Olam Zuta, the Megillat Ta'anit, and Abraham ibn David's Sefer ha-Ḳabbalah. It has been reedited several times since then.
- In 1577 Seder Olam Rabbah and Seder Olam Zuṭa were published in Paris, with a Latin translation by Gilbert Genebrard. The former was edited, with a Latin language translation, notes, and introduction, by John Meyer (Amsterdam, 1699).
- Commentaries on the work were written by Jacob Emden, by Elijah Wilna, and by Enoch Zundel b. Joseph.
- The three latest editions prior to 1906 are those of Ratner, A. Marx (who published the first ten chapters, basing the text upon different manuscripts and supplying it with a German language translation and an introduction; Berlin, 1903), and Jeroham Meïr Leiner (containing the commentaries of Jacob Emden and Elijah Wilna, and the editor's annotations under the title Me'r 'Ayin, Warsaw, 1904).
- Ben Halpetha, Jose (1971). M.D. Yerushalmi (ed.). Seder Olam Rabba (in Hebrew). Gil Publishers, in affiliation with the Haredi Youth Organization. OCLC 233091049.
- Heinrich W. Guggenheimer (2005), Seder Olam: The Rabbinic View of Biblical Chronology, Lanham, MD: Rowman and Littlefield (ISBN 978-0-7657-6021-0)
- Chaim Milikowsky (2013), Seder Olam: Critical Edition, Commentary, and Introduction (2 vols.), Yad Ben-Zvi: Jerusalem (OCLC 857371834)(ISBN 9789652173591)

== See also ==
- Missing years (Jewish calendar)
- Traditional Jewish chronology

== Bibliography ==
- The Jewish Encyclopaedia cites the following works:
  - Fürst, in Orient, Lit. vii. 547 et seq.;
  - idem, Bibl. Jud. ii. 107–108;
  - Grätz, Gesch. 3d ed., iv. 184, and note 14;
  - A. Marx, introduction to his edition of the Seder Olam;
  - B. Ratner, Mabo leha-Seder Olam Rabbah;
  - Steinschneider, Cat. Bodl. cols. 1433–1434;
  - Weiss, Dor, ii. 257 et seq.;
  - Winter and Wünsche, Die Jüdische Litteratur, iii. 299 et seq.;
  - Zunz, G. V. p. 85.
- Strack, H.L. (1991), Stemberger, Günter; Bockmuehl, Markus (eds.), Introduction to the Talmud and Midrash (Google eBook) (1996 ed.), Fortress Press, p. 326, ISBN 978-1451409147 (Note: page 326 in this edition was p. 354 in 1991).
