= Ahai ben Josiah =

Jewish halakhist

- Occupation: Tanna

Ahai ben Josiah was a halakhist usually identified as a second-century Babylonian tanna. According to The Jewish Encyclopedia he is mentioned in the Babylonian Talmud but not the Jerusalem Talmud, supporting a Babylonian association. His reputation was as a teacher of strict morality: "Whoever eyes woman will eventually fall into sin and whoever watches her step will rear unworthy children"."

He is credited with the following teaching by the Avot of Rabbi Natan (Fathers of Rabbi Nathan) comparing the relationship of the planter to earth with that of an infant to his mother:

He who purchases grain in the market place, to what may he be likened?
To an infant whose mother died: although he is taken door to door to other wet nurses, he is not satisfied.
He who buys bread in the market place, what is he like? He is as good as dead and buried.
He who eats of his own is like an infant raised at its mothers breast.
