= Talmid Chakham =

Honorific title given to one well versed in Jewish law

Talmid Chakham (Hebrew: תלמיד חכם) (Note: Also spelled Talmid Chacham.) is an honorific title that is given to a man who is well-versed in Jewish law, i.e., a Torah scholar. Originally Hebrew: תלמיד חכמים Talmid Chakhamim, lit., "student of sages", pl. תלמידי חכמים talmidei chakhamim, "students of sages"; inaccurate reconstruction of the singular, which is invariably shortened to ת"ח in printings, led to modern Hebrew: תלמיד חכם talmid chakham "sage student". The feminine equivalent is Talmidat Chakhamim, "student of sages" (pl. Talmidot Chakhamim), or, by extension of the same error, Talmidah Chakhamah, "sage student" (pl. Talmidot Chakhamot).

== Expectations ==
A Talmid Chakham must avoid six acts: to go abroad in perfumed garments; to walk alone at night; to wear shabby shoes; to converse with a woman while on the street (even if she is his wife); to sit in the society of an ignoramus; to be the last to enter the beth midrash.

With regard to association with an ignoramus, the Talmud says: "The Talmid Chakham is first likened by the ignoramus to a vase of gold; if he converses with him, he is looked on as a vase of silver; and if he accepts a service from him, he is regarded as a vase of earth." Among the privileges of the Talmid Chakham is the right of declining to present himself as a witness in suits concerning money transactions before a judge who is his inferior in knowledge.

The Talmid Chakham was expected to be familiar with all branches of Torah study and even all branches of general human learning. "He who understands astronomy", says Yochanan bar Nafcha, "and does not pursue the study of it, of that man, it is written: 'But they regard not the work of the Lord, neither consider the operation of His hands'" (Isaiah). Rabbi Yochanan also says that only someone able to answer all Halakhic questions, even those which deal only with the insignificant treatise Kallah, is a Talmid Chakham worthy to be appointed leader of a community. In accordance with this view, some later rabbinical authorities assert that in modern times no one deserves to be called by this epithet.

The principles with which the Talmid Chakham must live are enumerated in the first chapter of the work Derekh Eretz Zutta, opening with the following sentence: "The way of the wise is to be modest, humble, alert, and intelligent; to endure injustice; to make himself beloved of men; to be gracious in his interactions, even with subordinates; to avoid wrong-doing; to judge each man according to his deeds; to act according to the motto, 'I take no pleasure in the good things of this world, seeing that life here below is not my portion.' Wrapped in his mantle, he sits at the feet of the wise; no one can detect anything unseemly in him; he puts relevant questions, and gives suitable answers."

== Social position ==
Prizing Torah knowledge above all worldly goods, Talmidei Chakhamim in Jewish society were afforded many privileges and prerogatives as well as duties. In the Middle Ages, the Talmid Chakham was consulted by the Jewish community not only in spiritual matters but also in worldly affairs. Even when he held no official position in the community, he supervised religious activities, determined the time and form of prayers, verified weights and measures, etc. To enable him to devote himself entirely to study, Jewish legislation exempted him from the payment of taxes, and from performing any specific mundane duties.

Rabban Shimon ben Gamliel is quoted as having said: "[Every] person should always conduct himself as a Talmid Chakham."

In the beginning of the twentieth century, due to prevailing attitudes, Talmidei Chachamim were not widely respected among Jews. If a woman married one in those days, it was expected that she had some kind of terminal illness or disability that was a turn-down for others. However, post-Holocaust, the opposite is the case among Orthodox Jews, due to the resurgence of Orthodoxy since the mid-20th century.

== See also ==
- Hakham
- Jewish customs of etiquette
