= Derekh Eretz Zutta =

Minor tractate of the Talmud

Derekh Eretz Zutta (Hebrew: מסכת דרך ארץ זוטא) is one of the minor tractates of the Talmud.

"The Way of the Land", or "Ethics" are common translations of the Hebrew concept of "Derekh Eretz", which every scholar is expected to embody prior to taking up the study of Torah. Thus this "little book on ethics". The name is misleading in more than one respect; the word "zuta" (small) would seem to indicate that it is a shorter version of the treatise "Derekh Eretz Rabbah," which is not the case, the two having little in common. However, this name is ancient: Rashi and the Tosafists called the treatise both "Masekhet Derekh Eretz" and "Hilkot Derekh Eretz", the latter following b. Berakhot 22a. The designation "zuta" is probably of later origin.

== Versions ==
In the Talmud editions the treatise consists of nine sections ("perakim"), to which the Section on Peace ("Perek ha-Shalom") is added as a supplement.

The Halakhot Gedolot gives another version; here the same material is in two parts—(1) "Derekh Eretz Zuta," corresponding to sections 5–8, and (2) "Derekh Eretz Rabbah," containing sections 1-4 and 9. There are two manuscript copies with this division in the Bodleian, as well as a Cairo genizah fragment; but in the latter, the first four sections are under the title "Yir'at Chet." Qirqisani (a 10th-century Karaite) cites a passage from the fourth section under that title.

A third version is that in Machzor Vitry, where the first part of the eighth and the whole of the ninth section are given under the title "Hilkot Darkan shel Talmidei Ḥakamim."

It is noteworthy that in the Talmud editions, sections 4-8 are marked as having been taken from the Machzor Vitry. It should also be mentioned that the Siddur Rab Amram gives only the first and fourth sections, which is probably because the second and third were not included in the ritual.

== Summary ==
Apart from this external evidence, a closer examination shows that the work consists of three different collections: 1–4, 5–8, 9. However, it has a certain unity in that it consists almost exclusively of exhortations to self-examination and meekness and of rules of conduct, and urges temperance, resignation, gentleness, patience, respect for age, readiness to forgive, and, finally, the moral and social duties of a talmid chacham. It is written in the form of separate, short maxims arranged as Pirkei Avot, but differing in that they are anonymous. The compiler attempted to arrange the maxims according to external characteristics, the order followed being determined by the initial word, and by the number of maxims. Several precepts which begin with the same word are put together even when they are not at all related in subject-matter; especially are they thus combined into groups of four, five, or seven maxims, numbers which serve to aid in memorizing the passages. How far the compiler was able to carry out his principle cannot be judged from the text in its present condition; and to ascertain the original form of the treatise it is necessary critically to reconstruct the text. The following analysis of contents is based on such a reconstruction.

The first section begins with introductory remarks on the duties and proper conduct of a "disciple of the wise"; then follow seven teachings, each a precept in four parts, which, however, are often confused in the text as it now exists. The order is:

1. הוי
2. אל – which teaching is to be read according to Avot of Rabbi Natan (ed. S. Schechter) 26:83
3. אם
4. אל (the following saying, beginning with אם, belongs to No. 3, while the next אל teaching is the fourth part of No. 4)
5. העבר (the two missing parts to be supplied from Abot 2:4)
6. אהוב and its opposite הרחק
7. אל – originally four teachings as shown by the Vatican MSS. in Goldberg and Coronel's version and as confirmed by the parallels in Ab. R. N.; the concluding הרחק teaching belongs to No. 6. The three aggadic teachings which form the conclusion of the first section are a later addition.

The second section begins like the first, emphasizing particularly the duties of the "disciple of the wise." After a series of admonitions concerning only the student, there follow, to the end of the section, maxims of a general nature for people in the most varied walks of life. These are also arranged in seven teachings, each beginning with the word הוי, which word also comes before למוד להיות גומל בטובה . Then follow seven beginning with אל, and seven with אם.

In the third section the regular arrangement can be recognized beginning with the maxim אם רפית. There are three teachings each with אם and הוי; and as many with תחלת and אם. The following teachings probably belong to section four, and concern only the conduct of the student. The paragraph beginning with the words אל תאמר איש, which, as is to be seen from the Siddur Rab Amram, consists of four parts, concludes the fourth section, which is the end of the "Yir'at Chet."

From the fourth section to the eighth is a collection of maxims arranged on the same plan. The eighth section contains eight maxims beginning with כל, but the initial and concluding maxims are not relevant to the proper matter of section. The ninth section is a well-ordered collection of twenty-eight maxims arranged in four paragraphs; seven of these maxims begin with אהוב, seven with הוי, and fourteen with אם.

== Date of composition ==
The date of composition can only be conjectured. It is almost certain that sections 5-8 are the work of one editor, who lived after the completion of the Babylonian Talmud. One needs only to compare the maxim לעולם (in 5:2) with Sanhedrin 23a and Mekhilta of Rabbi Ishmael Mishpaṭim 20 to see that the compiler had the Talmud before him. The next maxim is a combination of Eruvin 65b and Avot of Rabbi Natan, ed. כל המתנבל S. Schechter, 32:68. In addition, Avot of Rabbi Natan 8, Midrash Mishlei 9:9, Pesikta Rabbati 8, כל זמן, and probably Derekh Eretz Rabbah were also used.

As already mentioned, the Spanish version of the Halakhot Gedolot, probably made about 1000, adopted these four sections as a complete treatise; hence one would not be far wrong in setting the 9th century as the date of composition. The first four sections date from a much earlier period. From their contents they may even have been an independent collection already in existence at the time of the Tannaim. At any rate this collection contains much that is old, even if it can not be proved that the Megillat Ḥasidim, which is cited in Abot de-Rabbi Natan, is identical with the treatise under discussion.

The ninth section, originally, perhaps, a small collection of maxims, is more modern than the first and older than the second part of the treatise.

The conclusion of the ninth chapter, which deals with peace, led to a Section on Peace ("Pereḳ ha-Shalom") being added to Derekh Eretz Zutta. In this work, various sayings concerning peace taken from different Midrashim (especially from the Midrash to Numbers 6:26) are placed together. This tenth (supplementary) section is comparatively a very late product, and is not found in Maḥzor Vitry, in Halakot Gedolot, nor in the manuscripts.

== Significance ==
Besides Pirkei Avot, this treatise is the only collection of precepts from the period of the Talmud and the Midrashim, and is therefore of great importance in any estimate of the earliest ethical views of the old rabbis. Zunz appropriately characterizes the treatise: "The Derek Ereẓ, Zuṭa, which is meant to be a mirror for scholars, is full of high moral teachings and pithy worldly wisdom which philosophers of to-day could study to advantage." The treatise deals mainly with man's relation to man, and is moral rather than religious in nature. A few quotations from it will illustrate its character:

- "If others speak evil of you, let the greatest thing seem unimportant in your eyes; but if you have spoken evil of others, let the least word seem important."
- "If you have done much good, let it seem little in your eyes, and say: 'Not of mine own have I done this, but of that good which has come to me through others'; but let a small kindness done to you appear great."

The treatise was much read, and the fact that it went through so many hands partly accounts for the chaotic condition of the text. Scholars of the 18th century did much, by means of their glosses and commentaries, toward making possible an understanding of the text, but a critical edition is still needed (as of 1906). A commentary to Derekh Eretz Zuta and well as Rabbah is available: A Modern Commentary to Talmud Bavli Tractates Derek Eretz Zuta and Rabbah : The Path and Wisdom for Living at Peace with Others. A more detailed commentary, concentrating on Derekh Eretz Zuta, especially on the Chapter on Peace. is available: Great is Peace: A Modern Commentary of Talmud Bavli Tractate Derek Eretz Zuta.

A copy of "Great is Peace" (the "Perek Ha-Shalom" section of Derekh Eretz Zuta) was commissioned to commemorate the signing of the Egypt–Israel peace treaty. Menachem Begin presented copies of it to Jimmy Carter and Anwar Sadat at El Arish, May 27, 1979.
