= Derekh Eretz Rabbah =

Derekh Eretz Rabbah (Hebrew: דֶּרֶךְ אֶרֶץ רַבָּה, lit. 'Great Way [of the] Land'; abbreviated as "DER") is one of the minor tractates (מַסֶּכְתוֹת קְטַנּוֹת, massekhtōt qeṭannōt) of the Talmud. In the editions of the latter, the tractate consists of three divisions:

- Derekh Eretz Rabbah
- Derekh Eretz Zuta (דֶּרֶךְ אֶרֶץ זוּטָה, 'Miniature Way [of the] Land')
- Perek ha-Shalom (פֶּרֶק הַשָּׁלוֹם, 'Chapter [on] the Peace')

This division is correct in that there are really three different works, but the designations "Rabbah" and "Zuta" are misleading, since the divisions so designated are not longer and shorter divisions of one work but, despite their relationship, are independent of each other. Early post-Chazalic authorities, who use different names for the treatise, know nothing of the division into "Rabbah" and "Zuta"; the Halakhot Gedolot, variously attributed to Simeon Kayyara or Yehudai ben Nahman, even includes a large part of the Derekh Eretz Zuta under the title "Rabbah."

== Summary of contents ==
According to the usual division, the DER consists of 11 chapters/sections (פְּרָקִים, perāqim; sg. perek).

- The first section contains Halakha (הֲלָכָה, 'the way') regarding arayot (עֲרָיוֹת, 'forbidden marriages/unions'), to which are appended some ethical maxims on marriage.
- The second section consists of two entirely different parts: the first contains reflections on 24 classes of people—12 bad and 12 good—with an appropriate Hebrew Bible verse for each class, while the second enumerates the sins that bring about eclipses of the sun and moon, as well as other misfortunes—the perek ends with some mystical remarks concerning God and the 390 heavens.
- Section 3, called "Ben Azzai" by the ancients, contains some moral reflections on the origin and destiny of man.
- Sections 4 and 5, each beginning with the word le'olam (לְעוֹלָם, 'forever'), contain rules of conduct for sages and their disciples, the respective rules being illustrated by biblical events and events during the era of the Tannaim (תַּנָּאִים, 'repeaters').
- Sections 6 and 7 (which seem to have been originally one section) illustrate, by means of several stories, the correctness of the rule of conduct, never, in society or at table, to act differently from others that are present.
- Sections 8 and 9 also discuss rules of conduct during eating and drinking, especially in society; and sections 6 and 8 begin with the word ha-nikhas (הַנִּכְנָס, 'the enterer').
- Section 10, on correct behavior in the bath, also begins with the same word, showing that all these sections, although they differ in content, were composed after one pattern.
- Section 11 begins with the enumeration of different things that are dangerous to life, and continues with the enumeration of actions and customs that are very dangerous to the soul.

== Composition and component parts ==
This short summary of the contents shows that the work is of very diverse origin and that each section has its own history. It is clear that Section 1 cannot, in view of its halakhic content, belong with the rest of the treatise, which deals exclusively with morals and customs. Elijah of Vilna was therefore undoubtedly right in assigning this section to the treatise Kallah, which precedes DER, and deals entirely with marriage and the rules connected with it. The whole section is merely a later compilation, although some of its passages cannot be traced back to the Talmudim and the Midrashim, as, for instance, the interesting parody on the hermeneutic rule of "kal ve-chomer".

Entirely different in origin is the first part of Section 2, drawn undoubtedly from an old tannaitic source. Four teachings of this section are cited in the Talmud as being taken from a Baraita, and one in the name of Rav, who often quoted old teachings and maxims. The composition shows that this section is not taken from the Talmud, for the division into 12 good and 12 bad classes of men is not found in the Talmud.

The other half of Section 2, however, is probably a later interpolation, belonging properly to Section 3. For this section begins with a saying of Ben Azzai concerning four things the contemplation of which would keep men from sin: hence the four classes of four things each that are enumerated in Section 2. Ben Azzai mentioned four things in connection with the four sayings. They are drawn from the Talmud. Section 3 seems to have been in ancient times the beginning of DER, for which reason the old writers called the whole treatise "Perek ben Azzai." Yet it is difficult to understand how this section came to be taken as the introduction to the treatise, which otherwise (beginning with Section 4) forms a connected whole, and has totally different contents from the Pereḳ ben Azzai.

Therefore, as regards date and composition, only sections 4-11 need be considered, since sections 1-3 were not originally integral parts of the treatise. Sections 4-11 are not only similar in content (in that both set forth rules of behavior for different walks of life, and illustrate their meaning by examples from history,) but their whole arrangement and composition also show the hand of the same author. Although the name of this author is not known, his date can be fixed approximately. Among the 16 authorities quoted in the part which has been designated above as the treatise DER proper, none lived later than Judah haNasi, the redactor of the Mishnah. The Yerushalmi quotes a teaching, found in the DER, with the formula "Tene be-Derekh ha-Eretz"; from this it appears that in the time of the Amoraim a tannaitic collection of the name "Derekh Eretz" was known, and there is no reason to consider this worth to be different from our DER. Nor is there any cogent reason for not considering this treatise as the source of the many quotations from Baraitas in Talmud Bavli which also appear in DER, although it must be admitted that a great many of the quotations existed in different collections of Baraitas, and that the Talmud drew sometimes from one source and sometimes from another.

Therefore, a contemporary of Rebbi (about 160-220)—not Rebbi himself—may have been the author of DER, the first three sections being added much later. A collection known as Hilkhot Derekh Eretz existed even in the school of Rabbi Akiva; but, as the term "Hilkhot" indicates, it was composed entirely of short teachings and rules of behavior and custom, without any references to Jewish Scripture and tradition. It is even highly probable that the treatise was based on the older collection, and that the work of the later editors consisted merely in the addition to the old rules of illustrations from the Bible and from history. For example, in the old collection there was a rule, "No one must enter the house of another without due announcement." This teaching was amplified by a later editor, who added: "This rule of behavior is taught out of the mouth of God Himself, who stood at the gate of paradise and called to Adam, 'Where are you?'" and to this is added the story of a journey of Jewish scholars to Ancient Rome, and how they comported themselves there.

== Stories ==
It is characteristic of this treatise that in order to emphasize its rules, it relates many stories of the private life of the Tannaim. A most interesting one is the following, which is used as an illustration to the rule, always to be friendly and obliging:

Once Simon ben Eleazar [probably more correctly Eleazar ben Simeon] met a very ugly man, and could not help exclaiming: "How ugly are the children of our father Abraham!" The man answered: "What can I do about it? Will you go and tell the Master who has created me?" Then Simon ben Eleazar fell down at the man's feet, asking his forgiveness. But the latter said: "I will not forgive you until you have gone to the Master who has created me, and have said to Him, 'How ugly is the creature which you have created!'" Only after much beseeching would the man forgive him; and on the same day Simon pronounced these words in the schoolhouse: "Be always pliable as the reed, and not hard as the cedar. Although the reed bends to the gentlest wind, it resists the fiercest storm; but the cedar, at first proud and inflexible, in the end yields to the wind, and is uprooted."

Stories of this nature lend a peculiar charm to DER.

== Other versions of the tractate ==
The version of the treatise found in Machzor Vitry is different from that in the editions of the Talmud. Instead of the first part of the second section, there is in the former version a collection of teachings and reflections on various subjects, arranged according to numbers. The version of the treatise Kallah in Nahman Coronel's Hamishah Kuntresim contains most of DER (specifically, the whole of sections 3–5, and parts of the following sections). Aside from the variants found here, Coronel's version has also a kind of "gemara" to the text. This gemara, however, is of very late origin, being in all probability a product of the 10th century, although it contains matter of great value and of very ancient (Essene or Hasidean) origin. The Gemara, which is quoted by Isaac Aboab I in Menorat ha-Ma'or, is printed in the Vilna Edition Shas.

== See also ==
- Jewish customs of etiquette

== Bibliography ==
It presents the following bibliography:

- The treatise DER was printed for the first time in the third Venetian edition of the Talmud (1546–1551);
- see also Moses Goldberg, Der Talmud. Tractat Derek Ereẓ Rabbah, Breslau, 1888, which contains a critical edition and a German translation (can be viewed here)
- Krauss, in Rev. Etudes Juives, xxxvi. 27–46, 205–221; xxxvii. 45–64;
- Weiss, Dor Dor we-Dorshaw, ii. 249-250:
- Zunz, Gottesdienstliche Vorträge der Juden, 2d ed., pp. 116–118.
