= Minor tractate =

Tractates covering topics of halakhah not covered by the Mishnah

The minor tractates (Hebrew: מסכתות קטנות, masechtot qetanot) are essays from the Talmudic period or later dealing with topics about which no formal tractate exists in the Mishnah. They may thus be contrasted to the Tosefta, whose tractates parallel those of the Mishnah.

Each minor tractate contains all the important material bearing on a single subject. While they are mishnaic in form and are called "tractates," the topics discussed in them are arranged more systematically than in the Mishnah; for they are eminently practical in purpose, being, in a certain sense, the first manuals in which the data scattered through prolix sources have been collected in a brief and comprehensive form.

There are 7 minor tractates. These short rabbinic texts each focus on a single topic of Jewish law. While much of their content is also found in the Mishnah, Tosefta, or Talmudic sources, they also include unique material not found elsewhere. Their name and form suggest that they originated in the period of oral tradition which was dominated by the Talmud and the Midrash, so that these treatises are doubtless of great antiquity, some of them having been compiled in their main outlines before even the final redaction of the Talmud in the 6th century.

In addition to the seven Minor Tractates, there are seven external tractates—texts not part of the official Mishnah canon. They vary in style and origin, with most material dating to the Tannaitic period and some later additions. Though not widely valued in early rabbinic circles, they were occasionally used in halakhic discussions and contain unique content not found elsewhere.

== List ==
The minor tractates are normally printed at the end of Seder Nezikin in the Talmud. They include:

=== The minor tractates ===
- Sefer Torah (regulations for writing Torah scrolls). Nearly equivalent to the first five chapters of Soferim.
- Mezuzah (Hebrew: מזוזה – scroll affixed to the doorpost).
- Tefillin (Hebrew: תפילין – phylacteries).
- Tzitzit (Hebrew: ציצית – fringes) discusses the biblical commandment (Numbers 15:38–40; Deuteronomy 22:12) to attach fringes (tzitzit) to four-cornered garments. The text explores who is obligated, the required garment types, and the proper construction of tzitzit.
- Avadim (Hebrew: עבדים – slaves) focusing on the laws and ethical treatment of Hebrew and Canaanite slaves. It outlines the Acquisition and release of Hebrew slaves, including through theft restitution, self-sale, or Jubilee. Special cases like the nirẓaʿ (a slave who chooses to remain with his master) and female Hebrew slaves. Rights and obligations of masters and slaves, including humane treatment, work conditions, and parting gifts upon release. Redemption laws, especially for Jews sold to non-Jews, and the roles of family and courts in redeeming them. Canaanite slaves and their emancipation through injury or legal documents. Ethical considerations, such as prohibitions against degrading labor and the importance of treating slaves with dignity.
- Gerim (Hebrew: גרים – converts) outlines the conversion process to Judaism, emphasizing sincerity, ritual requirements (circumcision, immersion), and ethical treatment of converts. It also discusses the status of resident aliens (ger toshav), legal implications of conversion, and the spiritual value and dignity of proselytes within Jewish tradition.
- Kutim (Hebrew: כותים – Samaritans) explores the boundaries of permissible and forbidden interactions with the Samaritan community, a group whose status oscillated between being considered part of the Jewish people in some contexts and being regarded as outsiders in others.

=== The external tractates ===
- Avot of Rabbi Natan (Hebrew: אבות דרבי נתן), an expansion of Pirkei Avot.
- Soferim (Hebrew: סופרים – Scribes). This tractate appears in two different versions in the Jerusalem and Babylonian Talmuds.
- Evel Rabbati (Hebrew: אבל רבתי – Elaboration on Mourning). Contains laws and customs pertaining to death and mourning, and is sometimes euphemistically called Semakhot ("joys").
- Kallah (Hebrew: כלה – Bride). On engagement, marriage and co-habitation.
- Kallah Rabbati (Hebrew: כלה רבתי – Great Bride). An elaboration of the previous.
- Derekh Eretz Rabbah (Hebrew: דרך ארץ רבה) "Derekh Eretz" literally means "the way of the world," which in this context refers to deportment, manners and behavior.
- Derekh Eretz Zuta (Hebrew: דרך ארץ זוטא) Addressed to scholars, this is a collection of maxims urging self-examination and modesty. The final chapter is called Perek ha-Shalom (Hebrew: פרק השלום – Chapter of Peace). On the ways of peace between people.

There is also a lost tractate called "Eretz Yisrael" (about laws pertaining to the Land of Israel). Similarly, a Masechet Hanukkah is mentioned in connection with the Vilna Gaon, but is not extant.

A translation of all of the minor tractates was published in two volumes by Soncino Press; a one-volume edition with the original Hebrew was later issued as part of their set of the Babylonian Talmud. Numerous translations of individual tractates have been produced by other publishers. The Yale Judaica Series includes translations of Avot de-Rabbi Natan and Semahot; the former has been translated at least three other times, and the latter also appears, along with the two Derekh Eretz tractates, in Michael Rodkinson's Talmud translation.
