= Evel Rabbati =

Evel Rabbati (Hebrew: אבל רבתי, "greater [tractate of] mourning") is one of the later or minor tractates which in the editions of the Babylonian Talmud are placed after the fourth order, Neziḳin; it treats of mourning for the dead. It is known also under the euphemistic name Semachot (שמחות), meaning "festive occasions" or "joys".

== References in the Talmud ==
A collection of baraitot entitled "Evel Rabbati" is cited in the Talmud, which quotes three teachings from it. But this work is not identical with the work now known as Evel Rabbati, since only one of the three teachings in question is found even in an approximate form in Semahot.

== The "Small" Evel ==
The designation "Evel Rabbati" in the Talmud suggests that a shorter treatise of similar content existed at the time of the amoraim, but probably the term "Rabbati" (the Large) was used merely because the collection of mourning regulations to which it was applied was more copious than that contained in the Mishnah. So much, however, is certain, that besides the treatise which is now known as Semaḥot or Evel Rabbati there was an older collection of baraitot concerning funeral ordinances, and that the former was designated "Rabbati" to distinguish between the two.

Natronai Gaon, answering the question "What is the Evel Rabbati?" said: "Evel is a treatise of the Mishnah in which are contained the regulations concerning mourning for the dead and most of the halakhic ordinances of the third chapter of Mo'ed Katan. There are two such: a large and a small one". Numerous fragments of the so-called "small" Evel treatise have been preserved, notably in Isaac ibn Ghayyat's Halakhot, in Nahmanides' Torat ha-Adam, in Tanya, and in Jacob b. Asher's Tur. To judge from these fragments, the small Evel contained regulations concerning visitation of the sick, treatment of the dying, laying out of the corpse, mourning for the dead, arrangement of graves, and collection of the bones ("ossilegium"), which was customary among the Jews as well as among the Greeks. This treatise, which is the oldest collection of halakhot on mourning customs, was compiled in Palestine; and, according to Brüll, R. Eleazar Bar Zadok, who lived in Lod at the time of Gamaliel II, prepared its core. It was then amplified, enriched, and revised by R. Ḥiyya, but as it was known to a small circle only, it was replaced by the later treatise Evel Rabbati, which borrowed much from it.

== Evel Rabbati ==
The currently extant tractate Evel Rabbati, or Semachot, is a post-Talmudic product and originated in the Land of Israel. This explains the many overlaps of its contents with the baraitot of the Jerusalem Talmud. It is a compilation from various older works; and in many passages traces of revision are to be noticed. The compiler incorporated a considerable part of the small Evel, as well as much from other works, besides adding original matter. The late compilation date of the tractate may be seen from the use of the two Talmudim and from the character of the composition itself, which is unmistakable.

The work reached Babylonia in the geonic period; and even at that time it received amplifications and additions from both Talmudim. It took on its present form probably in the middle of the 8th century, if not later. The work was comparatively widely circulated at the time of the later geonim, since reference to a passage in it is made in a question addressed to Sherira and Hai Gaon from a distant region. In their responsum to this question they call the tractate "Mishnatenu" = "our Mishnah". Rashi had the work in its present form, since he explicitly cites as the commencement of the tractate the opening words of the present text.

=== Organization ===
The tractate is divided into 14 chapters, and this division dates from the 13th century at the latest, since Mordecai ben Hillel cites it by chapters. The tractate contains almost complete instructions as to the treatment of the dying and the dead, from the commencement of the death-agony to the arrangement of the grave which receives the remains. Numerous examples from current practice are cited. A large number of aggadot also are included. On the whole, it furnishes much valuable material for the study of Oriental antiquities in general and of ancient Jewish practices in particular, for the verification of historical facts, and for an understanding of the development of Jewish customs.

The present text is defaced by many corruptions, so that its original form cannot now be determined. Wherever possible the commentators have made corrections on the basis of critical comparison, or have called attention to the corruptions.

=== Contents ===
The following is an outline of the tractate:

- The first chapter is preceded by an aggadic introduction, inasmuch as it is considered desirable to begin so mournful a tractate with a teaching of a lighter character.
- Ch. 1: A person in the agony of death is regarded in every respect as fully alive (§§ 1-8); mourning to be observed for heathen and slaves; other regulations concerning slaves. In this connection it is said that only the three patriarchs Abraham, Isaac, and Jacob may correctly be called the fathers of the Hebrew race, and only the four women Sarah, Rebekah, Rachel, and Leah, the matriarchs. (§§ 9-14).
- Ch. 2: Mourning customs to be observed for a suicide; cases in which a person found dead is to be regarded as a suicide (§§ 1-6); mourning to be observed, for a person condemned and executed by a Jewish tribunal (§§ 7-9); no mourning is to be observed, even by their nearest relatives, for persons who have renounced their nationality and their faith (§ 10); mourning to be observed for a person executed by a non-Jewish tribunal; other regulations (§§ 11-14).
- Ch. 3: The different burial customs, varying according to the age of the deceased.
- Ch. 4: Cases in which a priest may handle a corpse, although he thereby loses his priestly purity.
- Ch. 5: Mourners are prohibited from performing any work during the seven days of mourning; laws relating to excommunicants.
- Ch. 6: What a mourner may and may not do during the seven days of mourning; what a person under a ban may not do; attitude of the community toward him.
- Ch. 7: Nature of the thirty days' mourning. In connection therewith many other regulations are enumerated which have to do with terms of thirty days.
- Ch. 8: Customs which one may observe, although they appear to be heathen customs; various proverbs, anecdotes, and historical narratives.
- Ch. 9: Different mourning customs for different relatives and for different events.
- Ch. 10: Mourning while the corpse is still in the house; mourning for scholars and princes; and other regulations.
- Ch. 11: When two corpses are in the city, which of the two is to be buried first; the mourning of a wife for the relatives of her husband; signs of mourning to be displayed in the house of a mourner.
- Ch. 12, 13: Regulations concerning ossilegium (see above); various other regulations, and anecdotes.
- Ch. 14: Regulations concerning graves and the laying out of burial-places; the mourning feast in the house of the mourner.
