= Avot de-Rabbi Natan =

Avot of Rabbi Natan, also known as Avot de-Rabbi Nathan (ARN) (Jewish Babylonian Aramaic: אבות דרבי נתן), the first and longest of the minor tractates of the Talmud, is a Jewish aggadic work probably compiled in the Geonic era (c. 700–900 CE). It is a commentary on an early version of the Mishnah and exists in two forms: a standard printed edition and a second edition with 48 chapters published by Solomon Schechter, who labeled the two forms as A and B, respectively.

Despite being one of the minor tractates, it more closely resembles a late midrash. It may be technically designated as a homiletical exposition of the Mishnaic tractate Pirkei Avot (often abbreviated as Avot), having an older recension of that tractate for its foundation. It may also be considered as a kind of tosefta or gemarah of Mishna Avot, which does not possess a traditional gemarah.

ARN contains many teachings, proverbs, and incidents not found elsewhere in the early Rabbinic literature. Other Rabbinic sayings appear in a more informal style than what is found in Pirkei Avot.

== Recensions ==
Touching its original form, age, and dependence on earlier or later recensions of the Mishnah, many opinions are discussed in Solomon Schechter's introduction to the tractate. There are two recensions of the work, one of which is usually printed with the Babylonian Talmud in the appendix to Nezikin (the sixteenth volume), preceding the so-called minor tractates, and another, which, until the late 19th century, existed in manuscript only. In 1887, Schechter published the two recensions in parallel columns, contributing a critical introduction and valuable notes to the edition. There were likely other recensions, since the medieval rabbis quote from other versions.

To distinguish the two recensions, the one printed with the Talmud may be called A and the other, B. The former is divided into 41 chapters, and the latter into 48. Schechter proved that recension B was cited only by Spanish authors. Rashi knew of only recension A.

A Hebrew manuscript of Avot de-Rabbi Nathan is today housed at the Bodleian Library in Oxford, England, under the classification MS Oxford (Bodleiana) Heb. c. 24. In addition, MS Parma (Palatina) 2785 (de Rossi 327; Uncastillo/Spain, 1289), being a more precise copy of Avot de-Rabbi Nathan, has been used to correct errors in recension B.

== Contents ==
The content of the two recensions differs from each other considerably, although the method is the same in both. The separate teachings of the Mishnah Avot are generally taken as texts, which are either briefly explained—the ethical lessons contained therein being supported by reference to Hebrew Biblical passages—or fully illustrated by narratives and legends. Sometimes, long digressions are made by introducing subjects connected only loosely with the text. The following example may illustrate this method: Commenting on the teaching of Simon the Just, which designates charity as one of the three pillars on which the world rests, Avot de-Rabbi Nathan reads as follows:

How [does the world rest] on charity? Behold, the prophet (Hosea) said in the name of the LORD, "I desired charity [mercy], and not sacrifice". The world was created only by charity [mercy], as [it] is said, "Mercy shall be built up for ever", or, as the Rabbis translated this passage, "The world is built on mercy". Rabbi Yochanan ben Zakai, accompanied by Rabbi Joshua, once passed Jerusalem [after its fall]. While looking upon the city and the ruins of the [Second] Temple, Rabbi Joshua exclaimed, "Woe unto us, that the holy place is destroyed which atoned for our sins!" Rabbi Yochanan replied, "My son, do not grieve on this account, for we have another atonement for our sins; it is charity, as is said, 'I desired charity, and not sacrifice'."

The chapters of the two recensions of Avot de-Rabbi Nathan correspond with those of the Mishnah Avot as follows:

- Chapters 1–11 of recension A and chapters 1–23 of recension B correspond with Pirkei Avot 1:1–11, dealing with sayings of the Zugot
- Chapters 12–19 of A and chapters 24–29 of B correspond with Pirkei Avot 1:12–18 and chapter 2, dealing with the teachings of Hillel the Elder, Shammai, Yohanan ben Zakkai, and his disciples
- Chapters 20–30 of A and chapters 30–35 of B correspond with Pirkei Avot chapters 3–4, an independent mishnaic collection
- Chapters 31–41 of A and chapters 36–48 of B correspond with Pirkei Avot chapter 5, a collection of anonymous statements related by form

== Authorship ==
Nathan the Babylonian, whose name appears in the title, likely was not the sole author, since he flourished in the mid-second century, before the Mishnah's redaction. Additionally, several later authorities are quoted, like Rabbi Joshua ben Levi. The label de-Rabbi Nathan might be explained by the fact that Rabbi Nathan is one of the earliest authorities mentioned in the opening chapter of the work (although not the very first, which was Yose ha-Galili). It is possible that the school of the tanna to which Rabbi Nathan belonged was responsible for originating the work. Likely because of political differences that Rabbi Nathan had with Shimon ben Gamliel, his name does not appear in the version of Avot compiled by the redactor of the Mishnah, Rebbi, the son of the aforementioned Shimon ben Gamliel. However, it is also known that Rabbi Nathan made an independent collection, (Cashdan 1965) and it is possible that Avot de-Rabbi Nathan derives from that source.

It is also called the Tosefta to tractate Avot. The two versions of the work, in their current forms, evidently have different authors, yet their identities remain unknown. Both versions likely originated during the era of the Geonim, roughly between the eighth and ninth centuries CE.

== Date ==
Throughout most of the 20th century, Avot de-Rabbi Nathan was dated to the period between the seventh and ninth centuries CE. However, the work of Saldarini, which proposed a date closer to the redaction of the Mishnah in the third century, opened up a range of proposals for dating the text to earlier periods. Since Saldarini published his work in 1975, it is widely acknowledged that there are difficulties in dating the two versions of the ARN. As of 2021, proposals for the date of the text vary within a range of five centuries roughly from an earliest possible dating to the third century (B is usually the earlier-dated rescension, and some believe it predates the Talmud), with the latest possible dating being in the eighth century.

== Translations ==
- A Latin translation of Abot de-Rabbi Nathan was published by Franz Tayler, London, 1654: Tractatus de Patribus Rabbi Nathan Auctore, in Linguam Latinam Translatus.
- An English version is given by M. L. Rodkinson in his translation of the Babylonian Talmud, i. 9, New York, 1900.
- The Fathers According to Rabbi Nathan, translated by Judah Goldin, Yale University Press, 1955. (reprinted 1990)
- 'Aboth d'Rabbi Nathan, translated into English with Introduction and Notes, by Eli Cashdan, in The Minor Tractates of the Talmud, Soncino, 1965.
- Fathers According to Rabbi Nathan: Abot De Rabbi Nathan, Anthony J. Saldarini, Brill Academic, 1975.
- The Fathers According to Rabbi Nathan, Jacob Neusner, University of South Florida Press, 1986.
- Avos deRabbi Nassan, Mesorah Publications Limited, 2017.

== Commentaries ==
Schechter gives the commentaries to Avot de-Rabbi Nathan in his edition. Emendations were made by Benjamin Motal. Commentaries have been written by Eliezer Lipman of Zamość, Zolkiev, 1723; by Elijah ben Abraham with notes by the Vilna Gaon, by Abraham Witmand, and by Joshua Falk Lisser. Lisser's edition is reprinted in the Vilna Talmud.
