= Pirkei Avot =

Tractate of the Mishnah

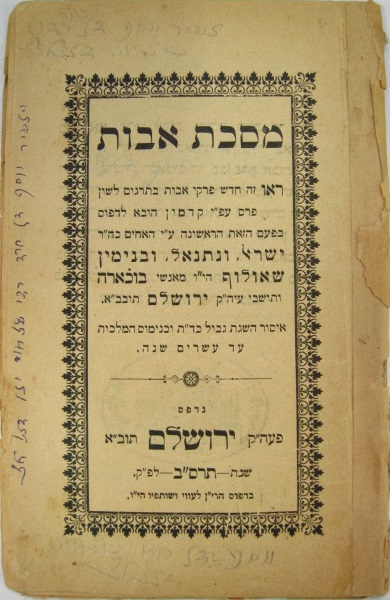
Pirkei Avot with Bukharian Judeo-Persian translation

Pirkei Avot (Hebrew: פִּרְקֵי אָבוֹת, romanized: pirqē aḇoṯ, lit. 'Chapters of the [Fore]fathers'; also transliterated as Pirqei Avoth or Pirkei Avos or Pirke Aboth, also Abhoth), is a compilation of the Jewish theological and ethical teachings and maxims from Rabbinic Jewish tradition. It is part of didactic Jewish ethical literature. Because of its contents, the name is sometimes given as Ethics of the Fathers. Pirkei Avot consists of the Mishnaic tractate of Avot, the second-to-last tractate in the order of Nezikin in the Mishnah, plus one additional chapter. Avot is unique in that it is the only tractate of the Mishnah dealing solely with ethical and moral principles; there is relatively little Halakha (Jewish law) in Pirkei Avot.

== Translation of the title ==
In the title Pirkei Avot, the word "pirkei" is Hebrew for "chapters of".

The word avot means "fathers", and thus Pirkei Avot is often rendered in English as "Chapters of the Fathers", or (more loosely) "Ethics of the Fathers". This translation engenders an appealing and not entirely mistaken image of "patriarchal teachings".

However, the term 'avot' is not usually used as an honorary designation for 'rabbis' or 'sages'; in rabbinical usage, it refers to the Patriarchs of the Bible. Rather, in the Mishnah, the word avot generally refers to fundamentals or principal categories. (Thus, the principal categories of creative work forbidden on Shabbat are called avot melacha, and the principal categories of ritual impurity are referred to as avot tum'ah.) Using this meaning, Pirkei Avot would translate to "Chapters of Fundamental Principles". Additionally, the possibility that the title was intentionally worded to support multiple renderings—both "fathers" and "fundamental principles"—cannot be ruled out.

The recognition of ethical maxims as, and translation of 'Avot' to, 'Fundamental Principles' may derive from the high regard in which the Torah, Mishnah, and Talmud hold such wisdom. "Love your neighbor as yourself," states the Bible (Leviticus 19:18), an injunction that Rabbi Akiva in Genesis Rabbah 24:7 famously calls a "great principle" of the Torah. In Shabbat 31a, Hillel, when challenged by a prospective convert to explain the entire Torah while the latter stood on one foot, answered: "That which is hateful to you, do not do to your fellow: This is the entire Torah, the rest is the explanation, go now and learn it." (This maxim is not included in Pirkei Avot.) The attribution of Biblical Wisdom books to King Solomon (e.g., Ecclesiastes, Proverbs, Book of Wisdom) attests also to the central importance that Jews of this period placed on transmitting the ethical way of life.

== Structure of the work ==
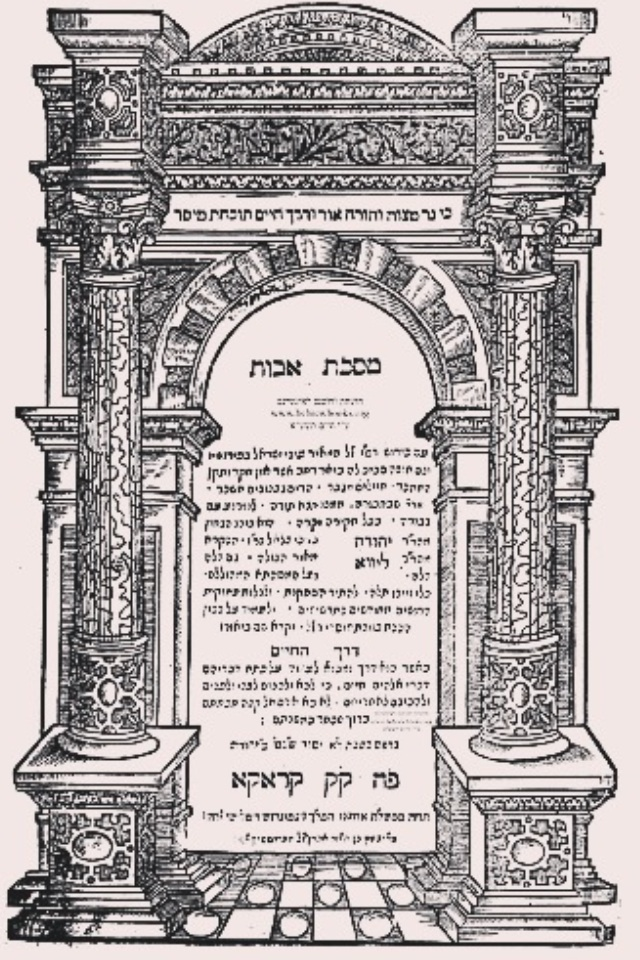
Derech Chaim commentary by Maharal (Cracow edition, 1589)

The Mishnaic tractate Avot consists of five chapters. It begins with an order of transmission of the Oral Tradition; Moses receives the Torah at Mount Sinai and then transmits it through various generations (including Joshua, the Elders, and the Neviim, but notably not the Kohanim), whence it finally arrives at the Great Assembly, i.e., the early generations of Sages (Avot 1:1). It contains sayings attributed to sages from Simon the Just (200 BCE) to shortly after Judah haNasi (200 CE), redactor of the Mishnah. These aphorisms concern proper ethical and social conduct, as well as the importance of Torah study.

The first two chapters proceed in a general chronological order, with the second focusing on the students of Yochanan Ben Zakkai. Chapters Three and Four are thematic and contain various attributed sayings in no explicit order. Chapter Five departs from the organization and content of the preceding four in that it consists mostly of anonymous sayings structured around numerical lists, several of which have no direct connection with ethics. The last four paragraphs of this chapter return to the format of moral aphorisms attributed to specific rabbis.

In liturgical use, and in most printed editions of Avot, a sixth chapter, Kinyan Torah ("Acquisition of Torah") is added; this is in fact the eighth (in the Vilna edition) chapter of tractate Kallah, one of the minor tractates. It is added because its content and style are somewhat similar to that of the original tractate Avot (although it focuses on Torah study more than ethics), and to allow for one chapter to be recited on each Shabbat of the Omer period, this chapter being seen well-suited to Shabbat Shavuot, when the giving of the Torah is celebrated. (See below.) The term Pirkei Avot refers to the composite six-chapter work (Avot plus Kinyan Torah).

Modern scholars suggest that Avot 5:21 ("He would say: A five-year-old proceeds to Bible [study], a ten-year-old to mishna [study]...") was not authored by Rabbi Yehudah ben Teimah (the author of 5:20, and seemingly the referent of "He would say" in 5:21) but rather by Shmuel ha-Katan, and was not part of the Mishna tractate of Avot, but rather added later to Pirkei Avot. In Machzor Vitry, for example, this passage is printed after the words "Tractate Avot has ended".

"The structure of the tractate differs greatly from the thematic structure of the other tractates and Avot sayings employ a highly stylized language instead of the clear and straightforward mishnaic prose. In addition, the anomalous character of Avot is heightened by the biblical influences on its linguistic expressions, grammatical forms, and vocabulary."

== Study of the work ==
From at least the time of Saadia Gaon (10th century), it has been customary to study one chapter a week on each Shabbat between Passover and Shavuot; today, the tractate is generally studied on each Shabbat of the summer, from Passover to Rosh Hashanah, the entire cycle repeating a few times with doubling of chapters at the end if there are not a perfect multiple of six weeks. The tractate is therefore included in many prayer books, following Shabbat afternoon prayers.

In the course of such study, it is common to preface each chapter with the Mishnaic saying, "All Israel has a share in the world to come" (Sanhedrin 10:1), and to conclude each chapter with the saying, "The Holy One, blessed be He, wished to bestow merit upon Israel; therefore he gave them Torah and mitzvot in abundance" (Makkoth 3:16).

== Notable sayings ==
The tractate includes several of the most frequently-quoted rabbinic sayings on a variety of topics, including:

=== Show kindness to others ===
- "The world stands on three things: on Torah, on works, and on kindness to others" (1:2; "work" here translates to "avodah" in the Hebrew, which can mean labor, service of God, prayer, or sacrificial offerings)
- "Your house should be open wide, and you should treat the poor as members of your household." (1:5)
- "Meet every person with graciousness." (1:15)
- "He [Yohanan ben Zakkai] said to [his disciples]: 'Go and see what is the right way that a man should seek for himself.' Rabbi Eliezer said: 'A good eye'. Rabbi Yehoshua said: 'A good friend'. Rabbi Yose HaKohen said: 'A good neighbor'. Rabbi Shimon [ben Netanel] said: 'One who sees consequences.' Rabbi Elazar said: 'A good heart'. He [Yohanan] said to them, 'I prefer the words of Elazar ben Arach to yours, because his words include yours as well.'" (2:13)

=== Respect of other persons ===
- "What is the right path a man should choose? Whatever is honorable to himself, and honorable in the eyes of others." (2:1)
- "Let your friend's honor be as dear to you as your own." (2:10)
- "The evil eye, the evil inclination, and hatred of [God's] creatures drive a person out of the world." (2:16)
- "Let your friend's money be as dear to you as your own." (2:17)

=== Strive for greatness ===
- "If I am not for myself, who will be for me? And being for myself, what am 'I'? And if not now, when?" (1:14) This saying is written in simple and terse Hebrew and is attributed to the sage Hillel, who was famous for succinct expression.
- "What is the right path a man should choose? Whatever is honorable to himself, and honorable in the eyes of others." (2:1)
- "In a place where there are no worthy men, strive to be worthy." (2:5)
- "He who acquires a good name, has acquired himself something indeed." (2:8)
- "Do not regard yourself as an evil person." (2:18)

=== Respect God ===
- "Do His will as if it were your own, so that He will do your will as if it were His. Nullify your own will before His so that He will nullify the will of others before you." (2:4)

=== Seek peace ===
- "Be amongst the students of Aaron: Love peace and pursue peace. Love people and bring them close to Torah." (1:12)
- "The more charity, the more peace" (2:8)

=== Take precaution to avoid transgressions ===
- "Make a fence for the Torah" (1:1)
- "Keep far from an evil neighbor, do not befriend a wicked person, and do not despair of divine retribution" (1:7)
- "Evaluate the loss of fulfilling a commandment against its reward, and the reward of committing a transgression against its loss. Consider three things, and you will not come to sin: Know what is above you: a seeing eye, a hearing ear, and all of your deeds written down in a book." (2:1)

=== Be humble ===
- "Love work, and do not admire official positions, and do not become too acquainted with the governing power." (1:10)
- "One who seeks to make his name great, destroys it" (1:13)
- "Anyone who works for the community, let your work with them be for the sake of Heaven... And as for you all, I will make your reward great as though you had accomplished all the work." (2:2)
- "Be wary regarding the ruling power, because they only befriend a person for their own purposes; they appear as friends when it suits them, but they do not stand by a man in his time of need." (2:3)
- "Do not separate yourself from the community, and do not be sure of yourself until your day of death." (2:4)
- "The more flesh, the more worms. The more possessions, the more worry. The more wives, the more witchcraft. The more maidservants, the more licentiousness. The more manservants, the more theft." (2:8)
- "If you have learned much Torah, do not flatter yourself about it, because it was for this purpose you were created." (2:8)
- "Let all your deeds be for the sake of Heaven." (2:12)

=== Be intent in prayer ===
- "Be careful when reciting the Shema and regarding prayer. Do not pray as though by rote, but plead for mercy and grace before God." (2:18)

=== Combine Torah learning with labor ===
- "Torah learning is best combined with an occupation, because the effort of both will keep one from sin. Torah study alone without work will in the end be nullified and lead to sin." (2:2) (See Torah im Derech Eretz.)
- "Reduce your business activities and occupy yourself with the Torah instead, and be of a humble spirit before everyone." (4:10)
- "If there is no Torah study, there is no worldly involvement (derech eretz); if there is no worldly involvement, there is no Torah study. ... If there is no flour, there is no Torah; if there is no Torah, there is no flour." (3:21)

=== Do not exploit your learning ===
- "One who exploits the crown (of scholarship) will pass away" (1:13)

=== Be careful with speech ===
- "All my life I was raised amongst the Sages, and I never found anything better for a person than silence... one who talks too much causes sin." (1:17)
- "Do not speak (excessively) much with women. This regards a man's own wife, how much more so regarding another man's wife!" (1:5)
- "Sages, you should be careful in what you say, lest you be punished with exile and be sent to a place of evil waters, and your pupils who follow you will die, and the name of Heaven will be disgraced." (1:11)
- "Say little and do much." (1:15)
- "Do not say something that cannot be understood, thinking it will be understood later." (2:5)

=== Do not seek rewards ===
- "Do not be like slaves who serve the master in order to obtain a reward. Rather, be like slaves who serve the master not to receive a reward. And let the fear of Heaven be upon you." (1:3)
- "Be as careful in observance of a minor commandment as in a major commandment, because you don't know the respective rewards for the commandments." (2:1)

=== Do not judge another person ===
- "Judge every person favorably" (1:6)
- "Do not judge your fellow until you have stood in his place." (2:4)

=== Be fair and deliberate in legal decision ===
- "[When judging,] do not act as an advocate. When litigants stand before you, regard them [both] as guilty. And when they leave you, regard them as meritorious, provided that they have accepted your judgment." (1:8)
- "Be thorough in examining witnesses, and watch what you say, so they do not learn from you how to lie." (1:9)
- "On three things the world continues to exist: On justice, truth, and peace." (1:18)

=== The time for action is now ===
- "If not now, when?" (1:14)
- "The main thing is not study, but doing." (1:17)
- "Do not say 'I will study when I have the time', for perhaps you will never have time." (2:5)
- "The day is short, the labor vast, the workers idle, the reward great, and the Employer is insistent." (2:20), attributed to Rabbi Tarfon
- "It is not incumbent upon you to complete the work, but neither are you at liberty to desist from it" (2:21), attributed to Rabbi Tarfon

=== Patience ===
- "An ignoramus cannot be sin-fearing, and a boor cannot be pious. A shy person cannot learn, and an impatient person cannot teach." (2:6)
- "Do not be quick to anger." (2:15)

=== The punishment matches the sin ===
- "He saw a skull floating on the water, and said to it, 'Because you drowned others, they drowned you. And they will also eventually be drowned because they drowned you.'" (2:7)

== Commentaries and translations ==
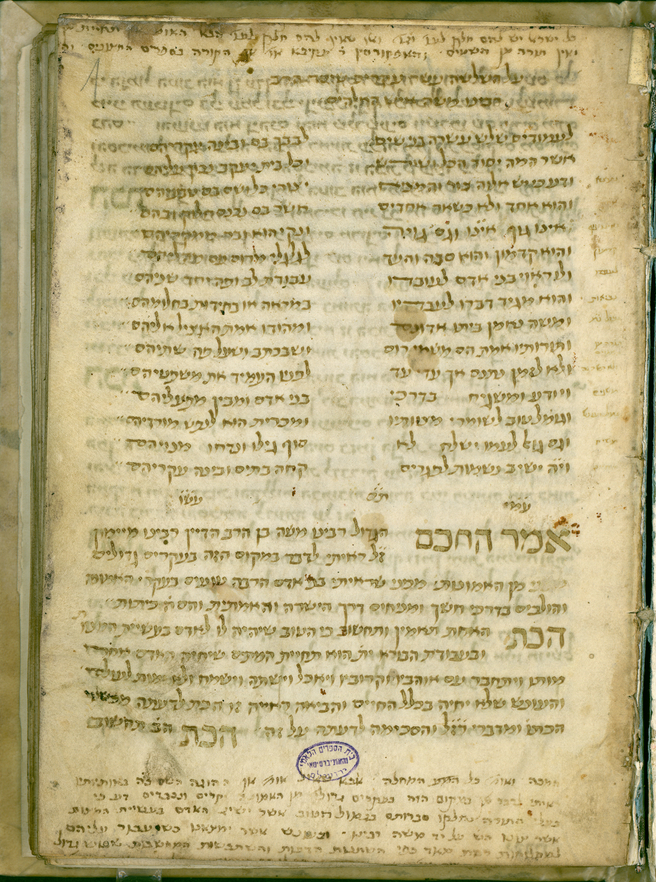
First page of a medieval manuscript of Maimonides's commentary on Pirkei Avot, The Eight Chapters.

Mishnaic tractates, composed in Mishnaic Hebrew, are usually accompanied by commentaries in Aramaic known as gemara ("the teaching"). Unlike the majority of Mishnaic tractates, Avot has no corresponding gemara. Some have said this is because the concepts in it can never be dealt with completely, being the "fifth part of the Shulchan Aruch" (being intrinsically "derekh eretz": wise practices).

Although Avot does not have an accompanying gemara, one of the minor tractates of the Talmud, the Avot of Rabbi Natan, is an expansion of the Mishnaic tractate containing numerous additional ethical teachings and legends.

The number of medieval and modern commentaries on the Tractate of Avot is large, and probably not known accurately. Among the best-known commentaries are the following:

- Samson Raphael Hirsch, Commentary on Pirkei Avot
- Yonah Gerondi on Avot
- Maimonides, on Avot, the introduction is known as The Eight Chapters.

A comprehensive bibliography of Hebrew commentaries on Pirke Avot has been published, including over 1500 detailed entries. The appendix lists over 500 additional books that contain a short segment on Avot, and over 400 published references on Avot in general or individual mishnayot.

=== Translations ===
The Russian-American poet and translator Yehoash published his Yiddish translation of Pirkei Avot in 1912 under the title Di Lehren fun di Foters. This translation was subsequently included in a trilingual (Hebrew-Yiddish-English) edition that was published in 1921.

A Chinese translation of Pirkei Avot by Prof. Ping Zhang from Tel Aviv University was published in 1996 by CASS Press, together with footnotes and an introduction of Rabbi Adin Steinsaltz. The first edition, of 1500 copies, sold out immediately. A revised version of Zhang's translation, with some influence from the Chinese Catholic Bible, was published in 2001 under the title "猶太聖傳·民刑卷·先賢篇" ('Jewish sacred teachings, records, and ethics articles'). It is available online.

== Intertextuality ==
Scholars have noted similar themes and language shared between Pirkei Avot and earlier Jewish traditions found in the Gospels, such as the parallel descriptions of "where two or three are gathered" used in the Gospel of Matthew for Jesus, and in Avot 3:2 for the Shekhinah.

== Sources ==
- Erin Kopelow. "Found Through Translation". Present Tense, issue 6.
