= Kallah =

Talmudic month-long learning convention held twice a year

Yarchei Kallah (Hebrew: ירחי כלה 'months of the bride') is the name of a teachers' convention that was held twice a year in Babylonian Academies, by the Jews then in captivity in Babylon, after the beginning of the amoraic period, in the two months Adar and Elul. The name refers to the Torah as bride to be studied in the months of farming inactivity after oil and wine harvest.

== Description ==
For each year's convention of the Kallah, a treatise of the Mishnah was written forming the subject of explanation and discussion at the convention, according to Ta'anit 10b. Rabbinowitz (1965) cites opinions attributing authorship to either Jehudai Gaon (8th century) or to Eliezer ben Hyrcanus (c.100 CE) with later additions and redaction.

The regular Kallah conventions concerned issues related to marriage, chastity, and moral purity. The subject matter was largely taken from the Babylonian Talmud.

The importance of the Kallah Convention (referred to under another name) is extolled in the Midrash Tanḥuma: "God has appointed the two academies ("yeshibot") for the good of Israel. In them day and night are devoted to the study of the Torah; and to there come the scholars from all places twice a year, in Adar and Elul, and associate with one another in discussions on the Torah." The greater the attendance at the convention, the greater was the renown of the academy. Hence Abaye says: "The most important part of the Kallah is a crowd." There was a saying in Babylonia that whoever dreamed of going into a forest would become president of the Kallah (the Kallah being likened to a forest).

In the land of Israel there was no Kallah. A. Schwarz claims that this cannot be asserted with certainty, but available historical records show that the Kallah was purely an institution practiced in Babylonia.

== Etymology ==
The Mishnaic Hebrew word Yarchei (sing. Yareiach) means "months." The word literally is translated as "moons." The source for this common Mishnaic term is the fact that Jewish months are based on the lunar cycle. (Note that there is a similar relationship between the English words moon and month.)

The word Kallah is always written with ה as in כלה. It's the Hebrew word for "bride".
