= Jerusalem in Judaism =

Significance of the city of Jerusalem in Jewish religious belief

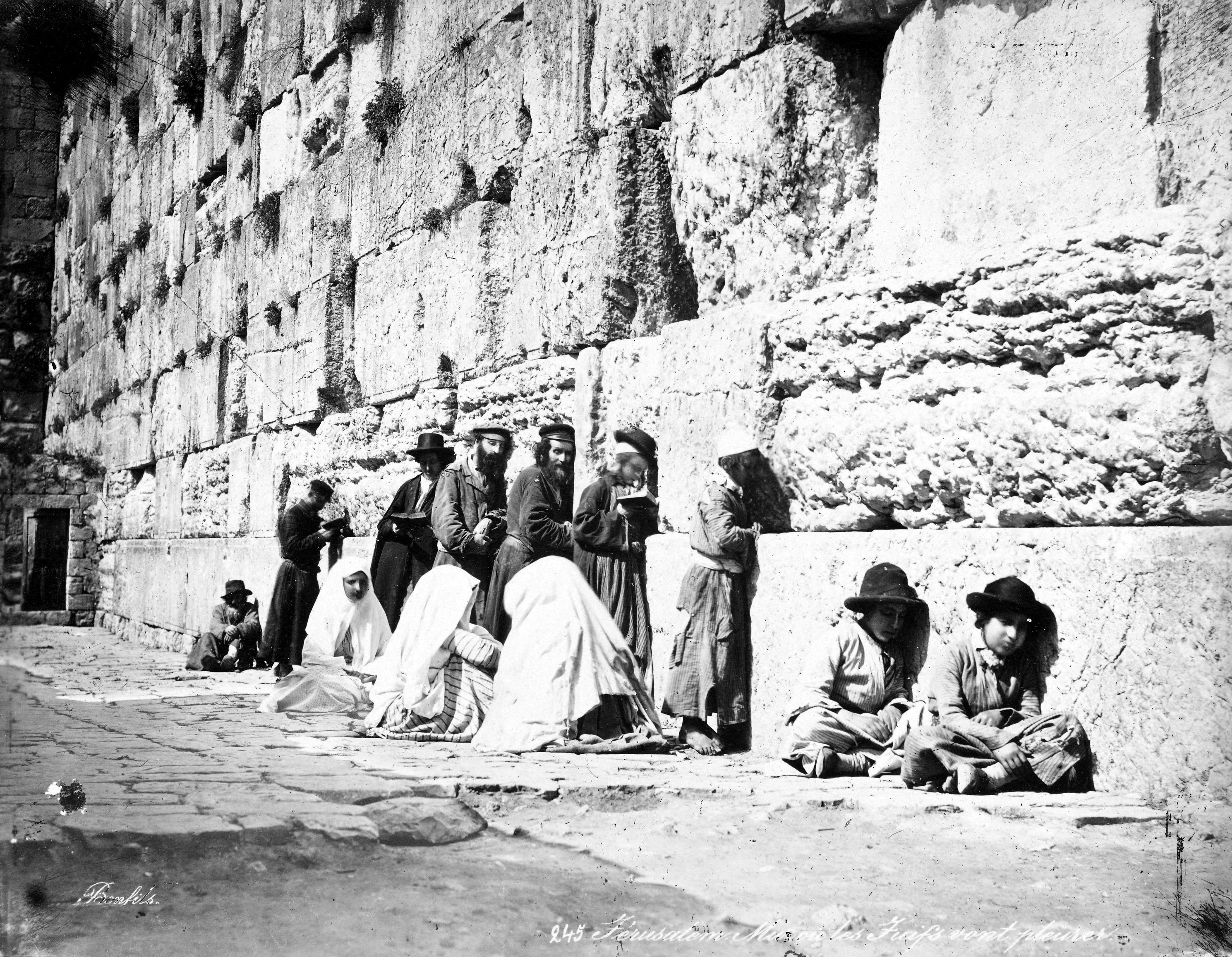
Jews praying at the Western Wall in Jerusalem in the 1870s.

Since the 10th century BCE, Jerusalem has been the holiest city, focus and spiritual center of the Jews. Jerusalem has long been embedded into the Jewish religious and national consciousness. Religious Jews believe that in the future the rebuilt Temple in Jerusalem will become the center of worship and instruction for all mankind and consequently Jerusalem will become the spiritual center of the world.

== In the Hebrew Bible ==
The name Yerushalem (Hebrew: ירושלם)—also written as Yerushalayim (Hebrew: ירושלים on five occasions—is mentioned a total of 669 times in the Hebrew Bible, while the term Zion, which is used as a symbolic mention of Jerusalem or as a reference to the entire Land of Israel, appears 154 times. Jerusalem first appears in the Bible, in the Book of Joshua.

For example, the book of Psalms, which has been frequently recited and memorized by Jews for centuries, says:

- "By the rivers of Babylon we sat down and wept when we remembered Zion." (Psalm 137:1)
- "For there they that carried us away captive required of us a song; and they that wasted us required of us mirth, saying, Sing us one of the songs of Zion. How shall we sing the LORD's song in a strange land? If I forget thee, O Jerusalem, let my right hand forget her cunning . If I do not remember thee, let my tongue cleave to the roof of my mouth; if I prefer not Jerusalem above my chief joy. Remember, O LORD, the children of Edom in the day of Jerusalem; who said, Raze it, raze it, even to the foundation thereof; O daughter of Babylon, that art to be destroyed; happy shall he be, that repay eth thee as thou hast served us. Happy shall he be, that taketh and dasheth thy little ones against the stones." (Psalms 137:3–9) (King James Version, with italics for words not in the original Hebrew)
- "O God, the nations have entered into your inheritance, they have defiled the sanctuary of your holiness, they have turned Jerusalem into heaps of rubble...they have shed their blood like water round Jerusalem..." (Psalms 79:1–3);
- "...O Jerusalem, the built up Jerusalem is like a city that is united together...Pray for the peace of Jerusalem..." (Psalms 122:2–6);
- "Jerusalem is surrounded by mountains as God surrounds his people forever" (Psalms 125:3);
- "The builder of Jerusalem is God, the outcast of Israel he will gather in...Praise God O Jerusalem, laud your God O Zion." (Psalms 147:2–12)

Jerusalem is not explicitly mentioned in the Pentateuch. Instead when referring to Jerusalem, the place names Salem and Moriah, and the term "the place that God will choose" are used:

You shall seek the place where the Lord your God chooses, out of all your tribes, to put His name for His dwelling place.

Maimonides cites various reasons why this is so, the first being that if the nations of the world had learned that this place was destined to become the centre of the highest religious ideals they would have occupied it to prevent the Jews from ever controlling it.

== In Rabbinic literature ==
The centrality of Jerusalem in Jewish thought is illustrated in rabbinic literature, which describes the city as the "navel of the earth," symbolizing its status as the cosmic center:

As the navel is in the middle of a human being, the Land of Israel is the navel of the world, as it is written: "dwellers of the navel of the earth. Just as Eretz Israel is located in the centre of the world so is Jerusalem in the centre of Eretz Israel, the temple in the centre of Jerusalem, the holy of holies in the centre of the temple, the ark at the centre of the holy of holies, and right in front is the foundation stone of the whole of the universe.

— Tanhuma to Leviticus, Qedoshim 10, ed. Buber, 78

Jewish religious writings contain thousands more references to Jerusalem, some of which are included in the following:

- If one is praying in the Land of Israel, he should direct his heart towards Jerusalem; If he is standing in Jerusalem, he should face towards the Holy Temple — Berakhot 27a
- Why are the fruits of Ginosar not found in Jerusalem? So that the pilgrims should not say "were it only incumbent on us to eat the fruits of Ginosar in Jerusalem, it would be enough" — Pesachim 8b
- In the future the Holy One will expand Jerusalem to the extent that a horse will flee and its owner will be able to recover it [while still being within the city’s limits] — Pesachim 50a
- Jerusalem was not divided among the tribes — Yoma 12a
- A snake or scorpion never injured anyone in Jerusalem — Yoma 21a
- Whoever did not see Jerusalem in her glory has never seen a beautiful city — Sukkah 51b
- Ten measures of beauty descended to the world, Jerusalem took nine — Kidushin 49b
- Jerusalem is the light of the world — Bereshit Rabbah 59
- Jerusalem will not be rebuilt until the ingathering of the exiles has occurred — Tanchuma Noach 11
- The Land of Israel sits at the centre of the world and Jerusalem sits at the centre of the Land of Israel — Tanchuma Kedoshim 10
- Why did the omnipresent not create warm springs in Jerusalem, like those of Tiberias? So a person should not say “Let us ascend to Jerusalem in order to bathe” — Sifre Behaalotecha 89
- There is no beauty like that of Jerusalem — Avot of Rabbi Natan 28
- Ten miracles occurred for our forefathers in Jerusalem — Avot of Rabbi Natan 35
- ”From all your tribes” – This refers to Jerusalem because all Israel are partners in her — Avot of Rabbi Natan 35
- In the future all the nations and kingdoms will be gathered unto Jerusalem — Avot of Rabbi Natan 35
- All who pray in Jerusalem - it is as if he prayed before the throne of glory, because the gate of heaven is situated there — Pirkei de-Rabbi Eliezer 35
- In the merit of Jerusalem I split the sea for them — Yalkut Shimoni Isaiah 473
- In the future the suburbs of Jerusalem will be filled with precious stones and jewels and all of Israel will come and take them — Yalkut Shimoni Isaiah 478
- From the day Jerusalem was destroyed, God has no joy, until He rebuilds Jerusalem and returns Israel to it — Yalkut Shimoni Lamentations 1009

== In Jewish Law and custom ==
=== Temple in Jerusalem ===
In antiquity, Judaism revolved around the Temple in Jerusalem. The Sanhedrin, which governed the nation, was located in the Temple precincts. The Temple service was at the heart of the Rosh Hashanah and Yom Kippur proceedings. The Temple was central to the Three pilgrim festivals, namely Passover, Shavuot and Sukkot, when all Jews were incumbent to gather in Jerusalem. Every seven years all Jews were required to assemble at the Temple for the Hakhel reading. The forty-nine-day Counting of the Omer recalls the Omer offering which was offered at the Temple every day between Passover and Shavuot. The eight-day festival of Hanukkah celebrates the rededication of the Second Temple after its desecration by Antiochus IV. A number of fast days including the Ninth of Av, the Tenth of Tevet and the Seventeenth of Tammuz, all recall the destruction of the Temple.

Maimonides records a list of bylaws which applied to Jerusalem during the Temple period: A corpse must not be left within the city overnight; human remains must not be brought inside the city; its houses are not to be rented out; residence for a ger toshav was not granted; burial plots are not maintained, other than those of the House of David and Huldah which existed from ancient times; the planting of gardens and orchards is forbidden; sowing and plowing is forbidden due to the possibility of decaying produce; trees are not planted, except for rose gardens which existed in ancient times; garbage heaps are forbidden due to infestation; girders and balconies may not overhang the public domain; pressure ovens are forbidden due to the smoke; it is forbidden to raise chickens.

=== In commemoration ===
The words "L'Shana Haba'ah" (meaning "Next Year in Jerusalem") are traditionally recited at the conclusion of the Yom Kippur service and of the Passover Seder outside of Jerusalem. The passage first appears as part of the liturgy for Yom Kippur in the Machzor Vitry published in the 12th-13th centuries, and for Passover in the Birds' Head Haggadah published around 1300 and was attested a century later by Rabbi Isaac Tyrnau as an accepted component of the Seder. In Jerusalem itself, the Passover Seder might conclude, "Next Year in Jerusalem, the rebuilt," referring likely to the Temple that was destroyed over two millennia ago.

There are various customs as to what to say when taking leave of a mourner sitting shiva. Ashkenazi Jews recite a traditional phrase that wishes comfort to a mourner by a reassurance that they will eventually reconnect to the person who died, in the same way that God comforts the Jewish people for the destruction of the Second Temple nearly 2,000 years ago through the promise of its eventual rebuilding in the times of the Messiah. The visitor says to the mourner:

הַמָּקוֹם יְנַחֵם אֶתְכֶם בְּתוֹךְ שְׁאָר אֲבֵלֵי צִיּוֹן וִירוּשָׁלָיִם
Hamakom y'nachem etkhem b'tokh sha'ar avelei tziyon viyrushalayim:
"May The Omnipresent comfort you (pl.) among the mourners of Zion and Jerusalem"

The Three Weeks beginning with the Seventeenth of Tammuz are known as Bein haMetzarim ("between the straits", i.e. between the days of distress), and serve as an annual period of Jewish communal sorrow ending on the fast day of Tisha B'Av — which is dedicated to remembering and mourning the destruction in Jerusalem of Solomon's Temple in 586 BCE and of the Second Temple in 70 CE — and has been described by Rabbi Jonathan Sacks as "the saddest day in the Jewish calendar". Some customs of mourning, which commemorate the destruction of Jerusalem, are observed from the start of the Three Weeks, particularly for Ashkenazi Jews, while many Sephardic Jews observe these customs during the Nine Days that begin on the First of Av.

== In prayer ==
Following the destruction of the Second Temple in 70 CE and the subsequent Jewish diaspora, classical Jewish liturgy became a primary vehicle for preserving the national memory of Jerusalem and the hope for the restoration of Zion. Consequently, explicit references to Zion and Jerusalem are ubiquitous in daily, Sabbath, and holiday prayers.

=== Daily liturgy ===
The Talmud specifies that Jewish prayer is recited while facing towards Israel by those outside it, while those reciting the prayer in Israel face Jerusalem and those in Jerusalem face towards the site of the Holy of Holies on the Temple Mount.

The structure and blessings of the Amidah prayer, recited a minimum of three times daily, were formulated to replace the sacrificial rites following the destruction of the Second Temple. The Talmud (Berakhot:30a) cites the prayer recited by the king at the dedication of Solomon's Temple (1 Kings 8) in ruling that the Amidah is recited facing towards Israel by those outside it, while those reciting the prayer in Israel face Jerusalem and those in Jerusalem face towards the site of the Holy of Holies on the Temple Mount. The Amidah's fourteenth blessing pleads for God to re-establish the Davidic monarchy and return his Divine presence to a rebuilt Jerusalem:

"And to Jerusalem, Your city, may You return in compassion, and may You rest within it, as You have spoke. May You rebuild it soon in our days as an eternal structure, and may You speedily establish the throne of King David within it. Blessed are You, God, the builder of Jerusalem...May our eyes behold Your return to Zion in compassion. Blessed are you God, who restores His presence to Zion".

It mentions Zion and Jerusalem five times.

On Tisha B'Av, that belssing is modified with a paragraph that begins Nachem ("Console...") that is added during the Amidah (for Ashkenazim, only at the Mincha service). The modified blessing opens "Lord our God, console the mourners of Zion and the mourners of Jerusalem and the city that is bereaved, destroyed, scorned and desolate". The conclusion of the blessing is revised to "Blessed are You, O Lord, Who consoles Zion and builds Jerusalem." Various Modern Orthodox and Conservative rabbis have proposed amending Nachem, as its wording no longer reflects the existence of a rebuilt Jerusalem under Israeli sovereignty after the Six-Day War, though these changes have not been widely adopted.

=== Sabbath and Holiday liturgy ===
- The Mussaf (additional) prayer, recited on Shabbat and festivals, emphasizes the exile and the hope for return:

But because of our sins we have been exiled from our land and sent far from our soil... Draw our scattered ones near from among the nations, and bring in our dispersions from the ends of the earth. Bring us to Zion your city in glad song, and to Jerusalem home of your sanctuary in eternal joy.

- During the Torah service on the Sabbath, Mondays, Thursdays, New Months, and major Jewish holidays, the congregation sings as the Torah scroll is removed from the ark:

Ki Mitzion: "For out of Zion shall go forth the Torah, and the word of the Lord from Jerusalem." (כִּי מִצִּיוֹן תֵּצֵא תוֹרָה ודבר ה׳ ירוּשָׁלָֽיִם)

- The Ya'aleh Ve-Yavo prayer, inserted into the Amidah and Birkat Hamazon on holidays and New Months, asks for the "remembrance of Jerusalem, the city of your holiness."
- In the Hashkiveinu prayer on the Sabbath eve, the conclusion of the blessing is altered to reflect this focus: "Blessed are You Lord, who spreads the shelter of peace over us, over His entire people Israel, and over Jerusalem."

=== Meals and blessings ===
- In Birkat Hamazon (Grace After Meals), recited after partaking of a meal eaten with bread, the third blessing — traditionally authored by King David — is entirely dedicated to the rebuilding of the city:

Have mercy Lord, our God... on Jerusalem Your city, on Zion the resting place of Your glory... Rebuild Jerusalem, the holy city, soon in our days. Blessed are you God who rebuilds Jerusalem in His mercy, Amen.

- The Bracha Achrona (specifically the thanksgiving blessing after a light meal, such as Al Hamichya), mirrors this sentiment:

Have mercy, Lord, our God... on Jerusalem, Your city; and on Zion, the resting place of Your glory... Rebuild Jerusalem, the city of holiness, speedily in our days. Bring us up into it and gladden us in its rebuilding and let us eat from its fruit and be satisfied with its goodness and bless You upon it in holiness and purity.

=== Days of mourning ===
- On Tisha B'Av, the Nachem prayer is inserted into the Mincha Amidah in the Ashkenazic tradition. It asks God to comfort those who mourn the destruction of Zion and Jerusalem. The prayer begins with "Comfort, Lord our God, the mourners of Zion and the mourners of Jerusalem..." and concludes with:

Blessed art Thou, Lord, who brings comfort to Zion and rebuilds Jerusalem.

== Customs in remembrance of Jerusalem ==
Many traditional Jewish customs are observed in remembrance of Jerusalem and the destruction of the Temple. One custom has a small amount of ash touched to the forehead of the groom before he goes to stand beneath the bridal canopy. This symbolically reminds him not to allow his own rejoicing to be "greater" than the ongoing need to recall Jerusalem's destruction. The well-known custom of the groom breaking a glass with the heel of his shoe at the conclusion of the wedding ceremony connects the effort to temper the joyous celebration with the subject of mourning for Jerusalem. It is a custom to recite the verses beginning "If I forget thee, O Jerusalem, let my right hand forget [her cunning]." (Psalm 137:5-6).

Another ancient custom is to leave a portion of the interior wall, located opposite the door to one's home and to leave it unpainted, as a remembrance of the destruction (zecher lechurban), of the Temples and city of Jerusalem.

According to Jewish law, as an expression of mourning for Jerusalem, it is forbidden to listen to any form of music, other than on holidays and at celebrations such as weddings and inaugurations of new Torah scrolls. This prohibition, however, while codified in the Shulchan Aruch, is not followed by the vast majority of Orthodox and even Haredi Jews nowadays.

== Pilgrimage ==
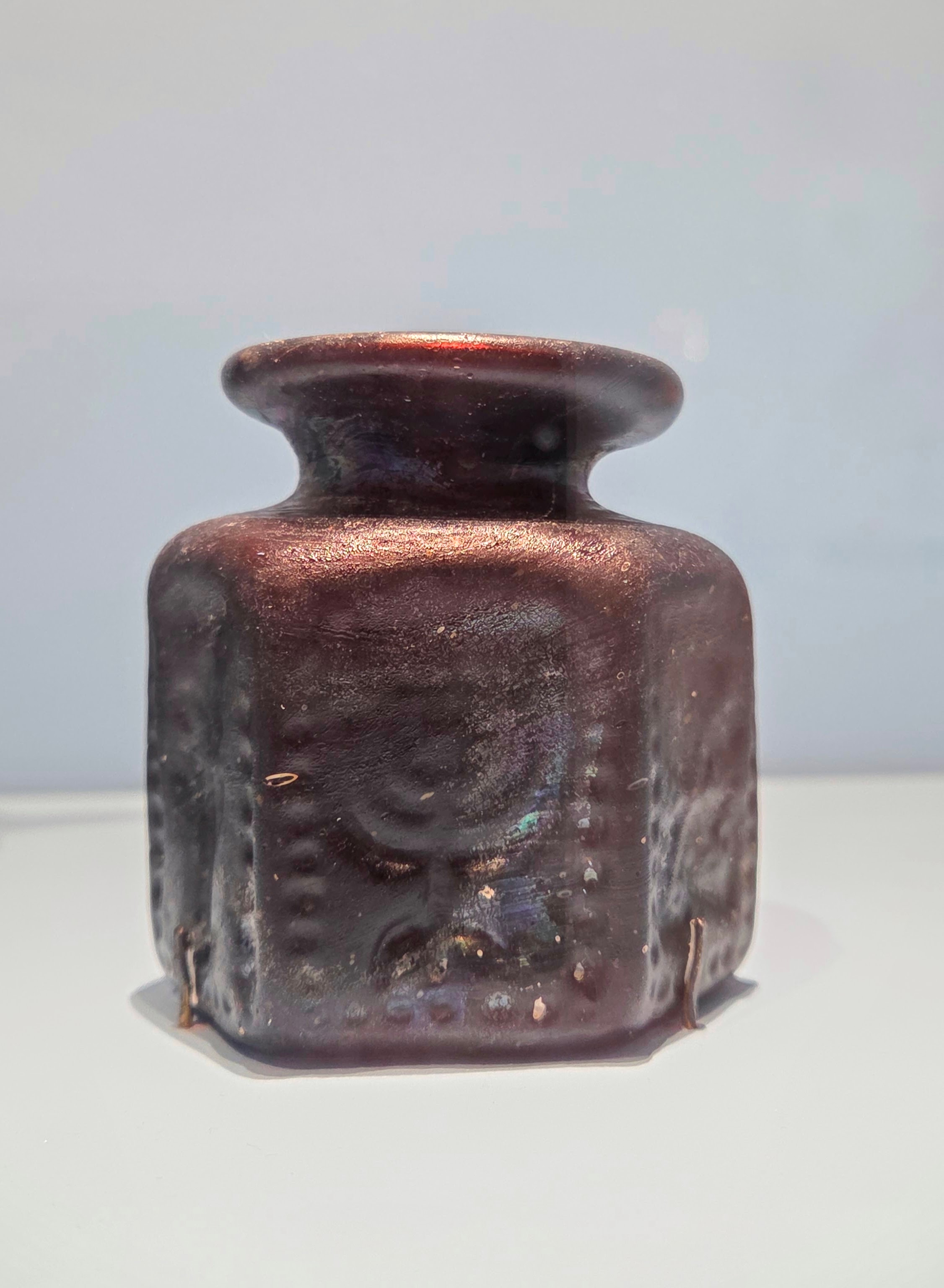
A mold-blown glass jar mass-produced as a souvenir for Jewish pilgrims to Jerusalem. Late 6th–early 7th century CE.

In the Second Temple period, Jews in and beyond the land of Israel made pilgrimages to the Temple on the Three Pilgrimage Festivals. Some pilgrims lodged at a nearby synagogue in the City of David, as described in the Theodotos inscription. Jews continued to travel to Jerusalem after the destruction of the Second Temple, although the practice was banned for a time by Byzantine decree in the fourth century. In the ninth through eleventh centuries, diaspora Jews from Asia and Europe embarked on pilgrimages to Jerusalem for the holiday of Sukkot and attended the Mount of Olives Hoshana Rabbah ceremony. Jewish pilgrims in this period also carried guidebooks containing prayers to recite while approaching city.

William Roberts Wilde, father of Oscar Wilde, described Jewish pilgrimage to Jerusalem in 1838: "Independently of that natural love of country which exists among this people, two objects bring the Jew to Jerusalem; to study the Scriptures and the Talmud — and then to die, and have his bones laid with his forefathers in the valley of Jehosaphat... On his first approach to the city, while yet within a day's journey, he puts on his best apparel; and when the first view of it bursts upon his sight, he rends the garments, falls down to worship, and prays over the long-sought object of his pilgrimage; and with dust sprinkled on his head, he enters the city of his forefathers... This, at least, is patriotism."

== Western Wall in Jerusalem ==
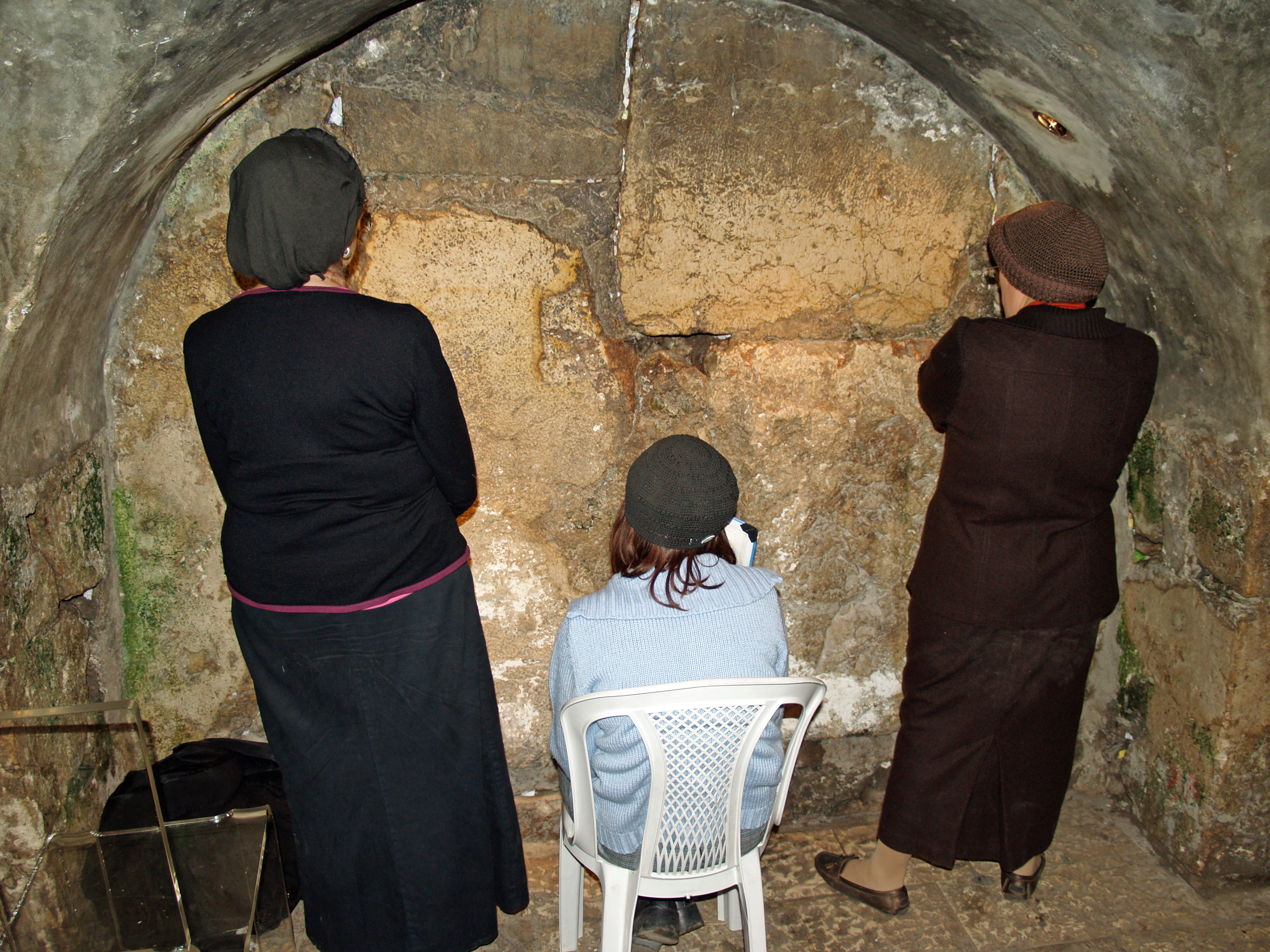
Orthodox Jewish women praying in Jerusalem's Western Wall tunnel at the closest physical point to the Holy of Holies.

The Western Wall (kotel hama'aravi), in the heart of the Old City of Jerusalem, is one of the holiest sites in modern Judaism. This is because it is the closest point to the site of the Holy of Holies which is currently inaccessible to Jews. Until 1967, it was generally considered to be the only surviving remnant of the Second Temple from the era of the Roman conquests; there are said to be esoteric texts in Midrash that mention God's promise to keep this one remnant of the outer temple wall standing as a memorial and reminder of the past. Hence also the name "Wailing Wall", used by non-Jews because many Jews would traditionally cry when they came before it.

However, the capture of Eastern Jerusalem in the Six-Day War revealed that the retaining wall of the Temple Mount in fact survived in all places.

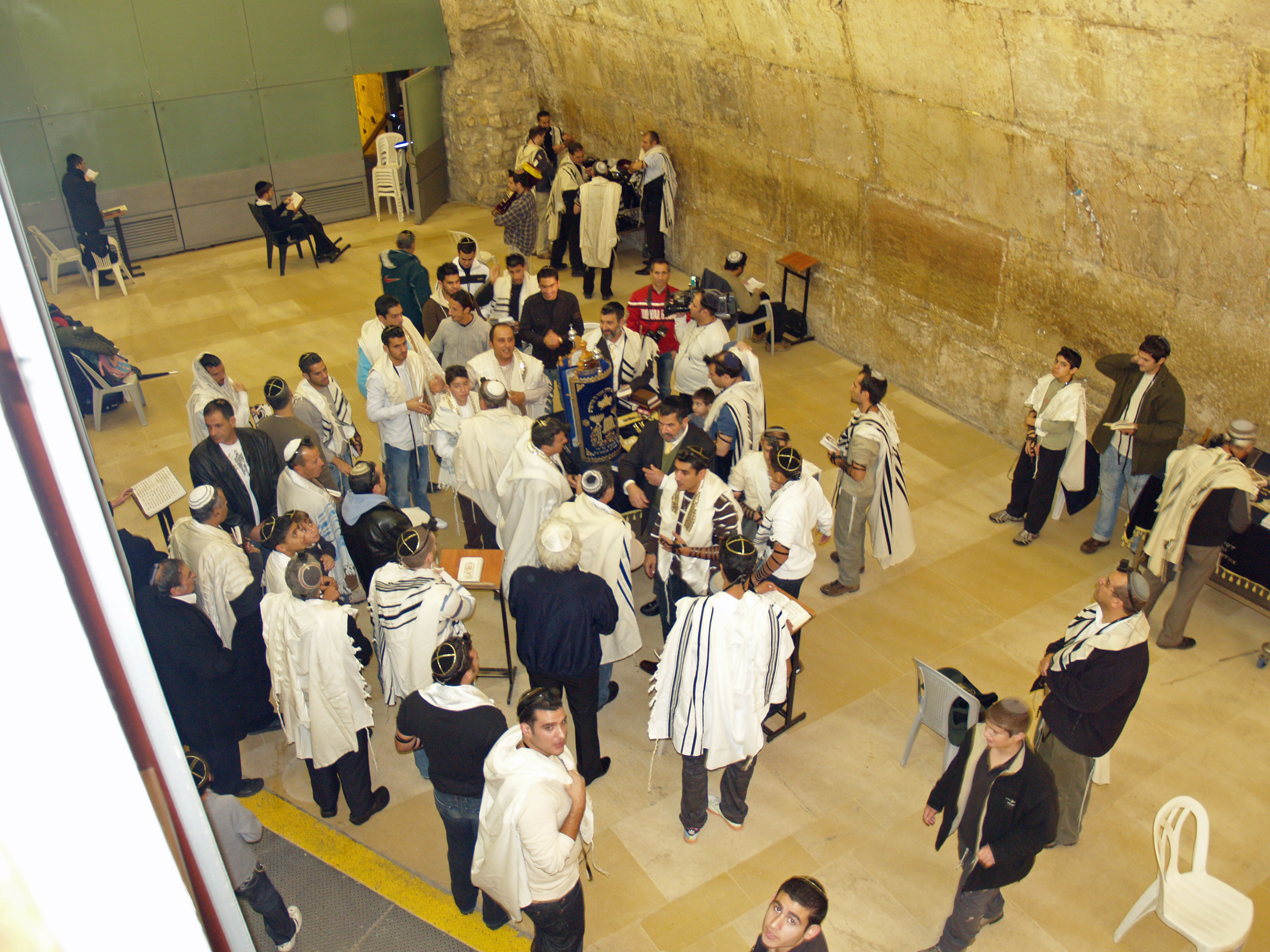
Celebration of Bar Mitzvah in the Western Wall tunnel in Jerusalem.

== Rabbis and Jerusalem ==
The Talmud records that the rabbinical leader Yohanan ben Zakkai (c. 70 C.E.) urged a peaceful surrender, in order to save Jerusalem from destruction, but was not heeded as the city was under the control of the Zealots. An early expression of the Jewish desire to "return to Zion" is the journey of Yehuda Halevi, who died in about 1140. Jewish legend relates that as he came near Jerusalem, overpowered by the sight of the Holy City, he sang his most beautiful elegy, the celebrated "Zionide" Tzion ha-lo Tish'ali and that at that instant he was ridden down and killed by an Arab.

He was followed by Nahmanides (Ramban) who, in 1267 emigrated to the land of Israel, and came for a short stay to live in Jerusalem. He wrote that he found barely ten Jews, as it had been desolated by the Crusades, nevertheless, together they built a synagogue that is the oldest that still stands to this day, known as the Ramban Synagogue.

In the 18th century, both the Vilna Gaon and Baal Shem Tov instructed and sent small successive waves of their disciples to settle in Jerusalem, then under Turkish Ottoman rule. They created a Jewish religious infrastructure that remains the core of the Haredi Jewish community in Jerusalem to this day, currently led by the Edah HaChareidis. Some of the descendants of the Vilna Gaon's students established the extremely anti-Zionist Neturei Karta movement.

== Creation of the State of Israel ==
The British Mandate of Palestine authorities created the new offices of "Chief Rabbi" in 1921 for both Ashkenazi Jews and Sephardic Jews with central offices in Jerusalem. Rabbi Abraham Isaac Kook (d. 1935) moved to Jerusalem to set up this office, associated with the "Religious Zionist" Mafdal group, becoming the first modern Chief Rabbi together with Sephardic Chief Rabbi Yaakov Meir. The official structure which housed the Chief Rabbinate until 1992, was completed in 1958 and is known as Heichal Shlomo.

In contrast, the Haredi Jews of Jerusalem formed the anti-Zionist Edah HaChareidis, an umbrella organization for all Haredi Jews, who were not Zionists and fiercely opposed the activities of the (Religious) Zionist movement. The first Chief Rabbi of the Edah HaChareidis was Rabbi Yosef Chaim Sonnenfeld. Several groups formerly aligned with the Edah gradually broke away from it; these include the Hasidic movements Belz and Skver. The Hasidic group Ger was never part of the Edah. Aside from the more famous Ashkenazi Edah, there is also a lesser known Sephardi Edah HaChareidit.

Jerusalem is also home to a number of the world's largest yeshivot (Talmudical and Rabbinical schools), and has become the undisputed capital of Jewish scholarly, religious and spiritual life for most of world Jewry. Examples of major yeshivos in Jerusalem are the Mir yeshiva and the Brisk yeshiva.

Major Hasidic dynasties headquartered in Jerusalem include Toldos Aharon, Toldos Avrohom Yitzchok, Dushinsky, Ger, Belz, Breslov, Karlin-Stolin, and Rachmastrivka. Most of these groups have a membership ranging from circa one thousand to tens of thousands. There are also several smaller groups, not mentioned here. (See also: Category:Hasidic dynasties headquartered in Jerusalem.)

== Jerusalem in modern Israel ==
Jerusalem in the 21st century is perceived by Israeli Jews in different ways, depending on their religious beliefs. In the summer of 2009, riots by Haredi Jews broke out in Jerusalem over the opening of a parking lot near the Old City on Saturdays. However, secular groups counter-protested, claiming that Jerusalem should be a city for all people, religious and non-religious. The call for an "open" Jerusalem has received support from Rabbi Dr. Donniel Hartman, an Orthodox Rabbi and President of the Shalom Hartman Institute, in Jerusalem. He wrote: "As a religious Jew who is also a Zionist I believe Jerusalem is not simply important as the city of God, but as the capital of the State of Israel, a state which, as distinct from you, I value as a part of my religious life. As a committed Zionist, I believe the citizens of our country need unifying symbols around which to construct our shared collective life. Jerusalem, one of the few remaining unifying concepts in our deeply divided Jewish world, may serve as precisely such as symbol. The meaning of Jerusalem as the capital of Israel is that it is a city which belongs to all citizens of the State of Israel. While you and I may observe Shabbat in similar ways, my fellow citizens of Israel observe it very differently. While you want to preserve the city, I want to preserve our people".

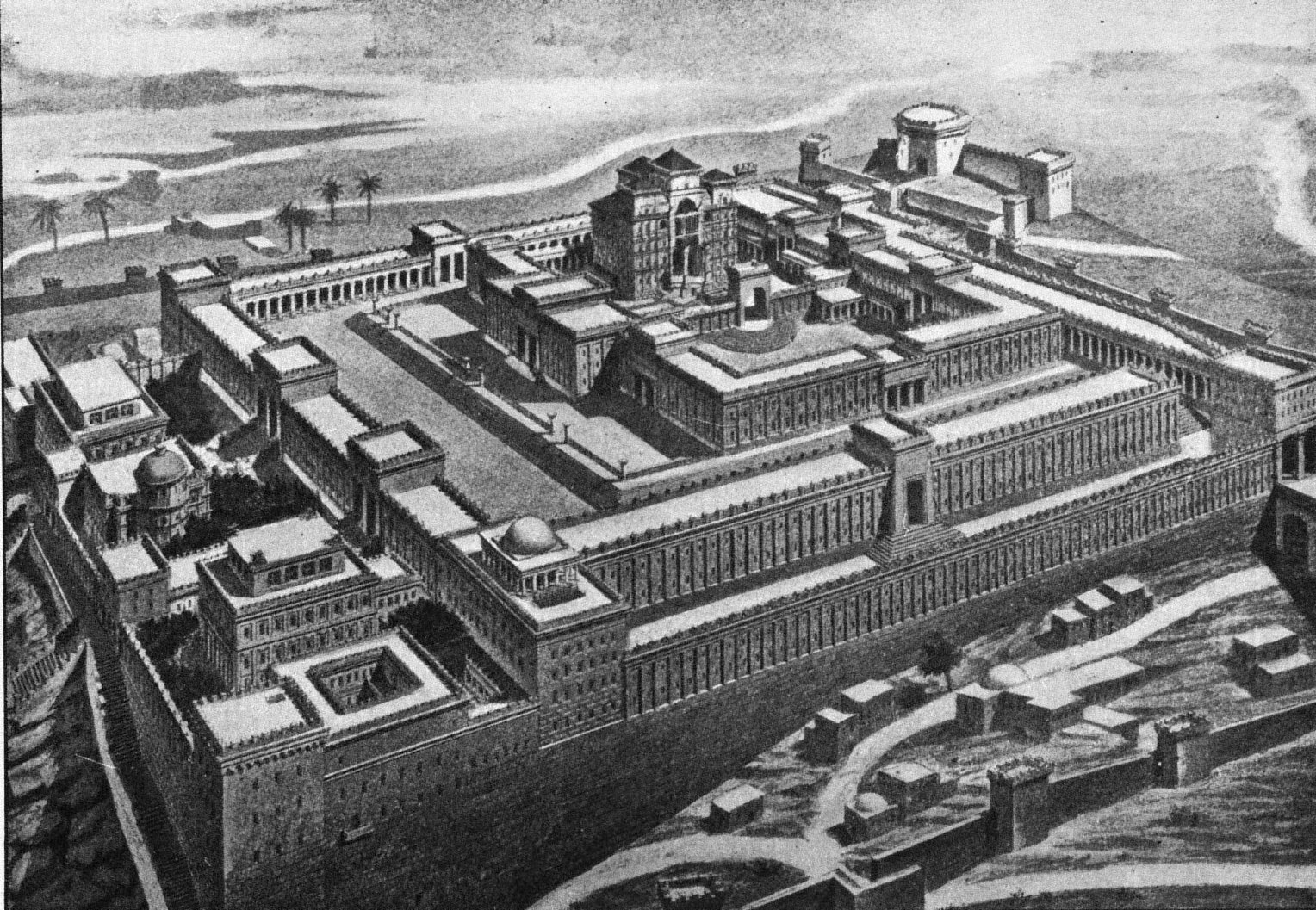
Reconstruction of the Temple of Solomon according with the Biblical description

A coin issued by the rebels in the year 68. Obverse: "Shekel Israel, year 3". Reverse: "Jerusalem the Holy".

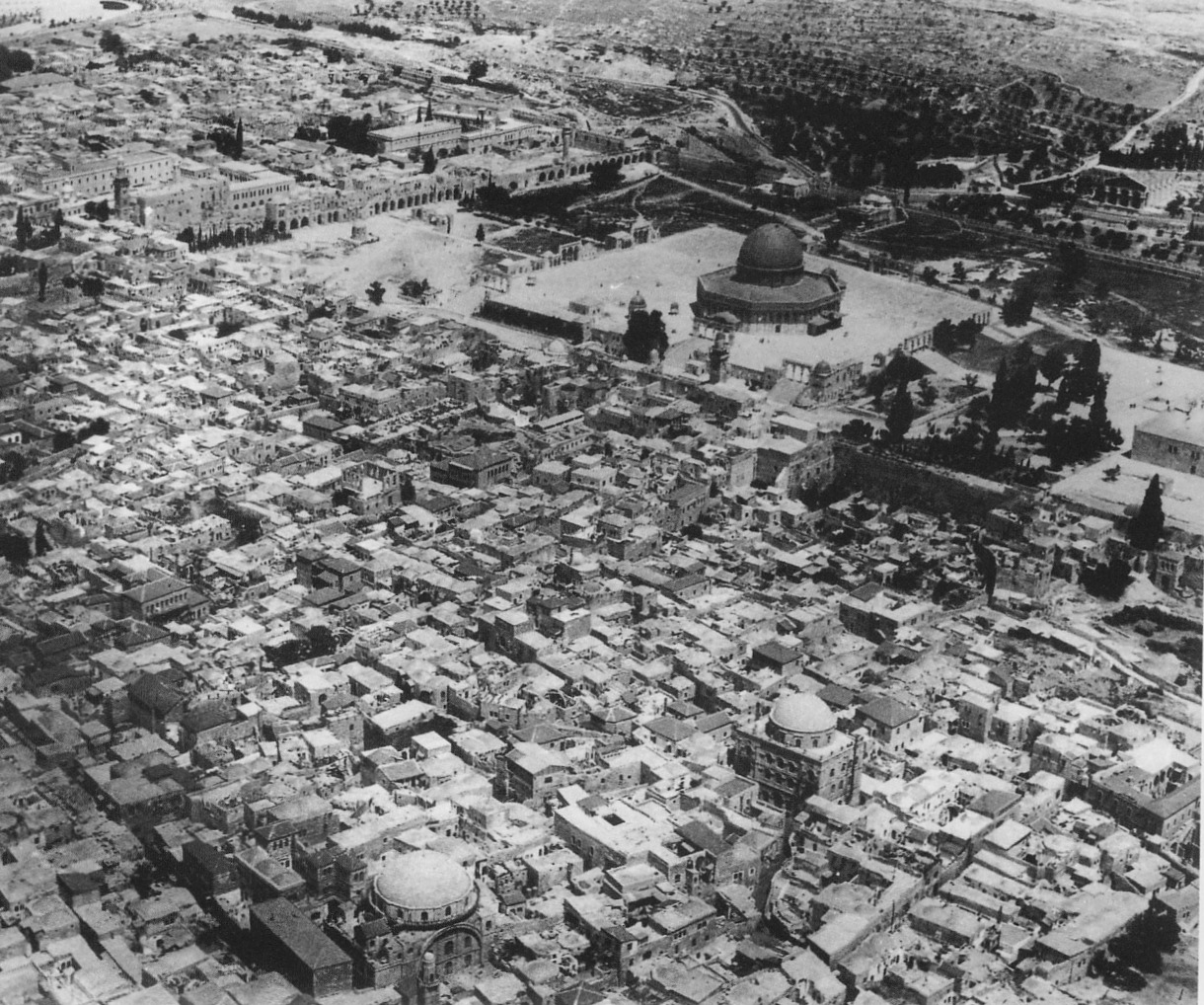
The Old City in the early 1900s. The two domes in the Jewish Quarter, (lower part of the photo), are of the Hurva and Tiferes Yisrael synagogues.

== See also ==
- Jerusalem of the West
- L'shana Haba'ah
- Laws and customs of the Land of Israel in Judaism
- Temple denial
