= Assar (name) =

Assar is a surname and a given name. Notable people with the name include:

Surname:

- Abdul Ghafoor Assar, Afghan footballer
- Abdul Ghani Assar (born 1923), Afghan footballer
- Alireza Assar (born 1970), Iranian musician, Persian pop singer and composer
- Khairallah Assar (1935–2015), professor of sociology at the University of Annaba, Algeria (1976–1996)
- Khalid Assar (born 1992), Egyptian table tennis player
- Omar Assar (born 1991), Egyptian table tennis player
- Premjibhai Assar, Indian politician, member of the Bharatiya Jana Sangh
- Shamsi Assar or Shushā Guppy (1935–2008), writer, editor, singer of Persian and Western folk songs

Given name:

- Assar Åkerman (1860–1936), Swedish jurist and Social Democratic politician
- Assar Gabrielsson (1891–1962), Swedish industrialist and co-founder of Volvo
- Assar Lindbeck (1930–2020), Swedish professor of economics at Stockholm University
- Assar Mossberg, Swedish footballer
- Assar Rönnlund (1935–2011), Swedish cross-country skier
- Assar Tabrizi (died 1377), Persian poet from Tabriz

== See also ==
- Assar, tehsil and sub division in the Doda district of Indian-administered Jammu and Kashmir
- Shivah Assar BeTammuz, Jewish fast day commemorating the breach of the walls of Jerusalem before the destruction of the Second Temple
- Assar Lindbeck Medal, bi-annual award given to the economist(s) in Sweden under the age of 45 whose work have gained the most international recognition
- Assar (comic strip), Swedish comic strip written and drawn by Ulf Lundkvist
