= She'eh Ne'esar =

She'eh Ne'esar (Hebrew: שְׁעֵה נֶאֱסַר) is a pizmon (responsory hymn) in the Seliḥot of the fast of the Seventeenth of Tammuz. It is signed with the acrostic Shelomoh, and deals with the four disasters of which the fast is traditionally the anniversary, namely:

1. the breaking of the two tablets by Moses;
2. the cessation of the Temple daily offering;
3. the storming of the outer defenses of Jerusalem during the Roman siege; and
4. the burning of a Torah scroll by Apostomus.

== See also ==
- Seventeenth of Tammuz
- Selichot
