= Mossberg =

Mossberg and Mosberg are surnames. Notable people with the surname include:

- Assar Mossberg (fl. 1930s), Swedish footballer
- Bo Mossberg (contemporary), Swedish author and illustrator of Den nya nordiska floran
- Daniel Mossberg (born 1981), Swedish professional bandy midfielder
- Edward Mosberg (1926–2022), Polish-American Holocaust survivor, educator, and philanthropist
- Fredrik Mossberg (1874–1950), Swedish sports shooter
- Irving Mosberg (1908–1973), American politician and judge
- Joel Mossberg (1870–1943), Swedish-American singer
- Mathew Mossburg (born 1967), American business owner and former legislator in Maryland
- Samuel Mosberg (1896–1967), American professional boxer
- Thomas W. Mossberg (born 1951), American physicist
- Walter Mossberg (born 1947), American journalist, well-known as a Wall Street Journal columnist

== See also ==
- Moosberg, a hill in Lower Saxony, Germany
- Herman T. Mossberg Residence, a house in South Bend, Indiana, United States
- O.F. Mossberg & Sons, an American firearms manufacturer
