= Salname =

Official annal of the Ottoman Empire

A salname (also called nevsal) was an official annal of the Ottoman Empire in the 19th century.

== History ==
The first salname was published in 1847. It was prepared by Ahmed Vefik Pasha, Ahmed Cevdet Pasha and Hayrullah. It was sponsored by the grand vizier Mustafa Reşit Pasha, a well known reformer.

== Types of the salname ==
The main salname was the salname of the state. Beginning by 1866 the vilayet (province) administrations also published salnames about the province. There were also salnames of other institutions both governmental and non governmental. The most important salnames were reportedly the second type salnames. Because by these salnames the government could determine the resources and the conditions of the provinces.
