= Khairallah =

Khairallah is both a given name and a surname. Notable people with the name include:

- Khairallah Abdelkbir (born 1983), Moroccan footballer
- Khairallah Assar (1935-2015), Syrian professor
- Khairallah Talfah (1919–1993), Iraqi politician
- Mounir Khairallah (born 1953), Lebanese eparch of the Maronite Catholic Eparchy of Batroun
- Khairallah Ghanoum, Syrian judge
- Violette Khairallah Safadi, Lebanese politician
