= The Three Weeks =

Mourning period for the destroyed Jewish Temples

The Three Weeks or Bein ha-Metzarim (Hebrew: בין המצרים, lit. 'Between the Straits') (Note: As in dire straits.) is a period of mourning commemorating the destruction of the first and second Jewish Temples. The Three Weeks start on the seventeenth day of the Jewish month of Tammuz—the fast of the Seventeenth of Tammuz—and end on the ninth day of the Jewish month of Av—the fast of Tisha B'Av, which occurs exactly three weeks later. Both of these fasts commemorate events surrounding the destructions of the Temple in Jerusalem and the subsequent exile of the Jews from the land of Israel. According to conventional chronology, the siege of Jerusalem by Nebuchadnezzar II occurred in 586/7 BCE and the second siege of Jerusalem (70), by the Roman Empire, in 70 CE. Jewish chronology, however, traditionally places the first destruction at about 421 BCE: see missing years (Jewish calendar) for more information.

== Observances ==
The mourning observances during the Three Weeks are divided into four levels, increasing in intensity:

1. From 17 Tammuz until the end of the month
2. From Rosh Chodesh Av until the week in which Tisha B'Av falls
3. The week in which Tisha B'Av falls until the Eighth of Av
4. Tisha B'Av itself

Standard Ashkenazic custom, or minhag, restricts the extent to which one may take a haircut, shave or listen to music with instruments. However, communities and individuals vary their levels of observance of these customs. Jewish marriages and other major celebrations are forbidden for Ashkenazi Jews during the Three Weeks, since the joy of such an event would conflict with the expected mourning mood during this time; for Sephardi Jews, this restriction on marriages is observed during the Nine Days.

Many Orthodox Jews refrain from eating meat during the Nine Days from the first of the month of Av until midday of the day after the fast of Tisha B'Av, based on the tradition that the Temple burned until that time.

=== Time of danger ===
The Three Weeks are considered historically a time of misfortune since many tragedies and calamities which befell the Jewish people are attributed to this period. These tragedies include the breaking of the Tablets of the Law by Moses, when he saw the people worshipping the golden calf; the burning of a Torah scroll by Apostomus during the Second Temple period; the destruction of both Temples on Tisha B'Av; the expulsion of the Jews from Spain shortly before Tisha B'Av 1492; and the outbreak of World War I shortly before Tisha B'Av 1914, which overturned many Jewish communities.

As a result, some Jews are particularly careful to avoid all dangerous situations during the Three Weeks. These include: going to dangerous places, undergoing a major operation that could be postponed until after Tisha B'Av, going on an airplane flight that could be postponed until after Tisha B'Av, and engaging in a court case if it can be postponed until after Tisha B'Av.

== History ==
The first source for a special status of the Three Weeks—which is also the oldest extant reference to these days as Bein ha-Metzarim—is found in Lamentations Rabbah 1:29 (4th century?). This midrash glosses Lamentations 1:3 ("All [Zion's] pursuers overtook her between the straits"), interpreting "straits" as "days of distress"—namely the Seventeenth of Tammuz and the Ninth of Av. Isaac Tyrnau (late 14th-early 15th centuries) wrote in his book Minhagim, a record of Austrian customs, that haircuts are not taken and weddings are not celebrated during the Three Weeks. His opinion was cited as halacha by Moses Isserles in Rema on Shulchan Aruch, which is the foundation for most of current Ashkenazic practice.

== Special haftarot ==
Special haftarot (passages from the Nevi'im), the "Three of Affliction" (tlat de-purʿanuta), are read in the synagogue on each Shabbat of the three weeks. These prophecies of Jeremiah and Isaiah predict the fall of Jerusalem, unlike most haftarot of the yearly cycle, which reflect the theme of the day's Torah reading.

The Pesiqta de-Rav Kahana is the first source to designate the appropriate 12 selections from the Prophets, the Three of Affliction being

1. "Divre Yirmeyahu", Words of Jeremiah (Jeremiah 1.1-2.3),
2. "Shim`u Devar Hashem" Hear the word of the LORD (Jeremiah 2.4-28), and
3. "Hazon Yisha`yahu" Vision of Isaiah (Isaiah 1.1-27).

Most congregations use the haftarot suggested by the Pesiqta de-Rav Kahana, which are not mentioned in the Talmud. But Maimonides in his Mishneh Torah prescribes a slight variation of these three, and Yemenite Jews read the haftarot that he lists. The nine haftarot of the eight weeks following Tisha B'Av likewise were selected for their content. These are the "Seven of Consolation" (shev di-nhemta) followed by the "Two of Repentance" (tarte di-tyuvta)—which two appropriately fall between Rosh ha-Shanah and Yom Kippur; one is read on Saturday like the other special haftarot, but the other is read on the Fast of Gedaliah.

== The Nine Days ==
According to the Mishnah, "from the beginning of Av, happiness is decreased." The last nine days of the three weeks—which are also the first nine days of the month of Av, culminating in the Tisha B'Av fast—constitute therefore a period of intensified mourning in the Ashkenazi custom. Many Jewish communities refrain from partaking of poultry, red meat, and wine; wearing freshly laundered clothes; and bathing in warm water. Sephardic Jews observe many of these restrictions only from the Sunday before Tisha B'Av, dispensing with them entirely in years when Tisha B'Av falls on a Sunday. Yemenite Jews do not maintain these customs.

== See also ==
Events

- Assyrian Siege of Jerusalem
- Solomon's Temple
- Babylonian captivity
- Second Temple
- Herod's Temple
- Destruction of Jerusalem
- Jewish–Roman wars
- Western Wall

Related holidays

- Seventeenth of Tammuz
- The Nine Days
- Tisha B'Av
