= Hayrullah =

Hayrullah, Hayrulla, Hajrullah, and Hajrulla are given names. Notable people with these names include:

- Hayrullah Efendi (1818–1866), Ottoman physician, historian, and official
- Hayrullah Efendi (born 1855), (1855–1918), Turkish politician
- Hayrullah Fişek (1885–1975), Ottoman-Turkish general and politician
- Hayrullah Şahinkaya (1934–2020), Turkish wrestler
- Hajrullah Koliqi (born 1946), Albanian-Montenegrin academician
- Hayrulla Karimov (born 1978), Uzbekistani footballer
- Hajrulla Çeku (born 1983), Kosovar politician
- Hayrullah Bilazer (born 1995), Turkish football player
- Hayrullah Erkip (born 2003), Turkish football player

== See also ==
- Khairallah, name and surname
