= The Nine Days =

Annual period of mourning in Judaism

The Nine Days of Av are a time of commemoration and spiritual observance in Judaism during the first nine days of the Jewish month of Av (corresponding to July/August). The Nine Days begin on Rosh Chodesh Av ("First of Av") and culminates on the public fast day of Tisha B'Av ("Ninth of Av"), a day regarded as "the saddest day in the Jewish calendar", mourning the loss of the two temples in Jerusalem.

The Nine Days are part of a larger period of time known as The Three Weeks, which begin with the public fast day of the Seventeenth of Tammuz—commemorated in Judaism for the time when the forces of Nebuchadnezzar of Babylonia broke through the defensive walls surrounding Jerusalem, generally accepted as happening in 586 BCE—and end with the public fast day of Tisha B'Av—when, according to the Mishna, the Babylonians destroyed the First Temple in 597 BCE and when the Second Temple was destroyed by the Romans in 70 CE. During the entire Three Weeks, certain activities are abstained by Jews observing Jewish law in order to commemorate, remember and inspire mourning over destruction of the Temple.

The Talmud says, "When the month of Av begins, we [i.e. Jews] reduce our joy." The Nine Days inaugurates an even greater level of communal and personal mourning in recognition of the many tragedies and calamities that befell the Jewish people at this time. The Nine Days are considered an inauspicious time even in our day and age.

Rather than view the Three Weeks and the Nine Days as times of punishment and self-mortification, some Jewish teachings see them as opportunities for introspection, repentance, and forging a closer relationship with God. The Talmud states that all who mourn the destruction of Jerusalem will merit to rejoice in its rebuilding. The Sages also teach that the Jewish Messiah will be born on Tisha B'Av. It is that promise of redemption which nevertheless makes this period one of hope and anticipation in Judaism.

== Mourning observances ==
=== Levels of mourning ===
The mourning observances during the Three Weeks are divided into four levels, increasing in intensity:

1. From the Seventeenth of Tammuz until the end of Tammuz (see also "The Three Weeks")
2. From Rosh Chodesh Av until the week in which Tisha B'Av falls
3. The week in which Tisha B'Av falls
4. Tisha B'Av itself
5. First half of the day after Tisha B'Av

During the entire Three Weeks, Ashkenazi Jews refrain from making weddings, playing or listening to music, and shaving or taking haircuts. Sephardi Jews begin these mourning observances on Rosh Chodesh Av, although Sephardi Jews generally do not hold weddings at all during the Three Weeks because they are an inauspicious time. Engagements are permitted. The custom is also to avoid saying the blessing over a new fruit on a weekday (one may do so on Shabbat), and making a major purchase such as a new home or car.

During the Nine Days, these additional activities are forbidden by Jewish law because they bring joy:

- Home improvements, painting and new construction
- Planting trees, flowers or grass
- Laundering clothes, towels, tablecloths and bed linens
- Wearing new or freshly laundered clothing
- Making or buying new clothes, towels, tablecloths and bed linens
- Eating meat or poultry
- Drinking wine or grape juice
- Bathing for pleasure (for example a hot tub, hanging out in the pool)
- Swimming or recreational sports for the purpose of leisure
- Listening to music

On Tisha B'Av itself, these additional prohibitions are observed:

- Eating and drinking
- Bathing
- Applying oils or perfumes
- Wearing leather shoes
- Sexual activity
- Greeting people
- Learning Torah [except for certain parts of the Scriptures and Talmud which deal with mourning or the destruction of the Temples].

The day after Tisha B'Av i.e. the 10th day of Av all halachik restrictions of the Nine days continue until Chatzos (MidDay).

For some restrictions, Jewish law makes a distinction between the beginning of the Nine Days and the week in which Tisha B'Av falls. (The new week begins on Saturday night). For example, the Ashkenazic custom is to permit nail trimming up until the week in which Tisha B'Av falls.

=== Meat and wine ===
The restrictions against eating meat and drinking wine, besides reducing a person's pleasure, recall the cessation of the Korban Tamid (daily animal sacrifice in the Jewish Temples in Jerusalem) and the Nesach Hayayin (wine libations) on the Temple Altar with the destruction of the Temple.

Many kosher meat restaurants alter their menus during The Nine Days, replacing meat and chicken dishes with fish and vegetarian options in order to remain open while the meat prohibition is in place.

Children, pregnant or nursing women, and old or sick people who must eat meat for health reasons are allowed to do so. It is advisable, however, for them to eat poultry or meat derivatives.

One who usually makes Havdalah over wine or grape juice at the conclusion of Shabbat may do so during the Nine Days. According to many opinions, it is preferable to have a child under the age of Bar Mitzvah/Bat Mitzvah drink the wine or grape juice.

=== Children ===
Children under the age of Bar and Bat Mitzvah are generally included in the lighter mourning practices as training for mitzvah-observance. Thus, they will also refrain from listening to music or getting haircuts during the entire Three Weeks. However, young children are allowed to wear freshly washed clothes, and parents are allowed to launder those clothes for their children during the Nine Days.

The Nine Days typically coincide with summer camps for Jewish children in America. While swimming and water sports are avoided, camps often run special study programs and Holocaust education modules. On Tisha B'Av itself, campers gather to listen to the traditional reading of the Book of Lamentations and engage in creative projects that express the themes of the day.

=== Exceptions ===
On Shabbat, all forms of mourning are suspended. Therefore, observant Jews eat meat at their Shabbat meals and drink wine or grape juice for Kiddush as usual. Similarly, while during the rest of the week one cannot wear freshly laundered clothes, on Shabbat, this is allowed.

Throughout the Nine Days (excluding Tisha B'Av), guests at a seudat mitzvah—for example, a brit milah ceremony, a pidyon haben, a bar mitzvah seudah on the boy's birthday, or a siyum—are allowed to eat meat and drink wine. Some yeshivas, kollels, and other study programs try to plan the completion of a volume of Talmud or Mishnah to coincide with the Nine Days so that a meat meal may be served.

The last Lubavitcher Rebbe, Rabbi Menachem Mendel Schneersohn, requested that a siyum of a Talmudic tractate should be held every day of The Nine Days. Chabad now broadcasts the completion of tractates on its website.

An exception to the prohibition against new construction is made in the case of a building constructed for a mitzvah. Thus, a synagogue, yeshiva or mikveh may be constructed or decorated during the Nine Days.

== Shabbat Chazon ==
During each of the three Shabbats of the Three Weeks, a different Haftarah is read in the synagogue after the Torah reading. These are:

1. Divrei Yirmiyahu (from the Book of Jeremiah 1.1-2.3) (In most years, this coincides with Pinechas. In leap years when the preceding Rosh Chodesh was a Thursday [or, in Israel, when the following Rosh Chodesh is a Monday], it coincides with Matot.)
2. Shim`u D'var Hashem (from the Book of Jeremiah 2.4-28) (In the leap years stated above when Matot is the first week, this coincides with Masei. In most years when Pinechas is the first week, Matot and Masei are read together for the second week.)
3. Chazon Yishayahu (from the Book of Isaiah 1.1-27) is read with the same tune used for the Book of Lamentations (In all years, this coincides with Devarim.)

The last Shabbat preceding Tisha B'Av is traditionally called Shabbat Chazon ("Sabbath [of the] Vision"), after the first words of the Haftarah read on this day. According to Biblical tradition, the prophet Isaiah prophesied about the looming destruction of the first Jewish Temple in Jerusalem and the subsequent punishment that God would mete out to the Jewish people, mainly their exiles in the Jewish diaspora.

== Eighth of Av ==
The eighth day of Av is called Erev Tisha B'Av (the eve of the Ninth of Av). It is customary to eat a large meal early in the afternoon before Mincha services, and then to have the Seudah HaMafseket ("cut-off meal") right before sunset.

The Seudah HaMafseket resembles the meal of a mourner. The custom is to eat cold, hard-boiled eggs or lentils with bread and water. Only one cooked food may be eaten. The bread is dipped in ashes. Those who are eating sit on the ground or on low chairs, as they will during the night and morning of Tisha B'Av, and do not converse with each other.

If the Eighth of Av falls on a Shabbat or Friday, the Seudah HaMafseket is not eaten.

== Ninth of Av ==
The ninth day of Av, or Tisha B'Av, is a fast day of extreme sadness and mourning over the destruction of the Temple. Some of the observances of this day resemble those of shiva, such as sitting on a low chair and not greeting people, while other observances reflect the theme of loss: the removal of the curtain from the ark, the lowered lighting in the synagogue, and the recital of Kinnot (elegies over the persecutions of Jewish communities throughout history). After midday, one may sit on a regular chair, but all the other restrictions of Tisha B'Av and the Nine Days continue to apply.

== End of restrictions ==
The restrictions of The Nine Days conclude at midday of the Tenth of Av, the day after Tisha B'Av. The Sages enforced this extension of the mourning period to reflect the fact that while the Temple was set on fire during the afternoon of Tisha B'Av, it continued to burn through the Tenth of Av. All the prohibitions associated with The Nine Days are still in effect until midday, although one who attends a seudat mitzvah at this time may consume meat and wine.

When Tisha B'Av falls on a Shabbat, the fast day is postponed until Sunday (the Tenth of Av). In this case, most restrictions end at nightfall after the fast. Except for the drinking of Havdalah wine, consumption of meat and wine are delayed until the following morning. Some opinions say that one should not listen to music until the next morning.

== Shabbat Nachamu ==
The Shabbat after Tisha B'Av is called Shabbat Nachamu ("Sabbath of Comforting"), after the Haftarah read on this day from the Book of Isaiah 40:1-26, which speaks of "comforting" the Jewish people for their suffering. This is the first of the seven Haftarahs of consolation that express the theme of redemption, leading up to the holiday of Rosh Hashanah, the Jewish New Year.
