= Apostomus =

Name occurring in Talmudic tradition

Apostomus is a name occurring in Talmudic tradition.

== The Talmudic account ==
Among five catastrophes said to have overtaken the Jews on the Seventeenth of Tammuz, the Mishnah includes "the burning of the Torah by Apostomus".

Owing to this very vague mention, there is much difference of opinion as to the identity of Apostomus. At first glance he may be associated with one of the following two incidents:

- Flavius Josephus relates that about the year 50 a Roman soldier seized a Torah-scroll and, with abusive and mocking language, burned it in public. This incident almost brought on a revolution; but the Roman procurator Cumanus appeased the Jewish populace by beheading the culprit.
- The other incident of the burning of the Torah, which took place at the time of the Hadrianic Persecutions, is recounted by the rabbis. Ḥanania ben Teradyon, one of the most distinguished men of the time, was wrapped in a Torah-scroll and burned.

In connection with this, a certain "philosopher" is mentioned as the executioner of Ḥanania. Some circumstances lend plausibility to the idea that the name is a corruption. According to the Jerusalem Talmud, Apostomus burned the Torah at the narrow pass of Lydda (or, as another report has it, at Tarlosa, which was probably not far from Lydda); and it is known that Ḥanina was one of "the martyrs of Lydda." Furthermore, a somewhat later authority gives the date of Ḥanina's death as the twenty-seventh of Tammuz, which is only a difference of a few days from the date assigned to the crime of Apostomus.

The Mishnah referred to adds the following statement to its account of the burning of the Law: "And he put up an idol in the sanctuary." Here it is first necessary to determine that the reading ("and he put up") is correct, and that it should not be ("and there was put up"), which the Jerusalem Talmud gives as a variant in the accepted text, interpreting the event mentioned in the Mishnah as referring to the idols put up in the sanctuary by Manasseh. But the passage in the Mishnah on the five calamities of the Ninth of Ab enumerates them in strictly chronological order; so that it is unlikely that a reference to the Temple desecration by Manasseh should be registered after the burning of the Torah by Apostomus. The Babylonian Talmud knows only the reading ("and he put up") in the Mishnah, as the remark of the Gemara proves, where the "abomination of desolation," of which Daniel speaks, is connected with the image of the idol in the Temple. By this expression can only be meant the statue of Zeus Olympius set up by Antiochus Epiphanes.

== Another name for Antiochus Epiphanes? ==
The reading found in Rashi and in the Munich manuscript, has been simply drawn from the Jerusalem Talmud. But the statement in the Babylonian Talmud, that the Mishnah source concerning Apostomus is a Gemara (tradition), shows that, according to the Babylonian authorities, the date of Apostomus can not be placed later than the Maccabean period.

For Gemara is a technical term employed by the Talmud to designate tannaitic sayings connected with Biblical events or laws that are neither mentioned nor alluded to in the Scriptures, in contradistinction to those derived from the Biblical text.

Hence it is argued that Apostomus must belong to a time in reference to which there existed also written sources that were known to the Talmudic authorities, the latest limit being the Maccabean period; and as it has been shown that the pre-Maccabean and the Biblical epoch must be excluded, it follows that Apostomus was none other than Antiochus Epiphanes, of whom, moreover, it is known, also from other sources, that he set up an idol in the Temple.

Apostomus, then, must be considered as a nickname for Antiochus Epiphanes. In fact, his name was transformed even by pagan authors into "Epimanes" = "the Insane". As told in I Macc. i. 56, Torah-scrolls were burned during the persecutions by Antiochus Epiphanes.

== Meaning of the name ==
The meaning of the name "Apostomus" is not clear. Ewald (in his "History"), alluding to certain passages in the Bible and the Apocrypha, where reference is had to the boastful mouth of Antiochus Epiphanes, derives "Apostomus" from αἰπύς ("big") and στόμα ("mouth"). The appellation "big-mouth" is certainly appropriate, but αἰπυς is a rare word, used only in poetry.

More probable perhaps is Jastrow's derivation of "Apostomus" from ἐπιστομίζω ("to stop or stuff up the mouth") and ἐπιστίμος ("anything that stops up the mouth"), which may be connected with the Talmudic phrase ("May his mouth be stuffed full with earth!"), applied in the Talmud to the name of a man who had spoken boldly against the Deity.

The following are other explanations of the word:

- Jastrow offers a suggestion that it may be a corruption of ἀπόστολος ("ambassador"), and makes it refer to the envoy spoken of in II Macc. vi. 1, 2 as having desecrated the Temple.
- Hochstädter sees in "Apostomus" a corrupted form of ἀποστάτης ("apostate") and identifies him with the high priest Alcimus.
- Schwarz and Derenbourg consider "Apostomus" the name of the Roman soldier referred to by Josephus. The name of the soldier who burned the Torah scroll was Stephanos, which, written in Hebrew, may have been corrupted.
- Brüll connects him with Cornelius Faustus, who under Pompey was the first to climb the wall of Jerusalem.
- Halberstamm is of opinion that "Apostomus" is the Hebrew transcription for the Latin "Faustinus," and that the name, furthermore, is to be connected with Julius Severus, whose surname was Faustinus, and who perpetrated the crime described in the Mishnah when he was sent by Hadrian to put down the Bar Kokba rebellion, in which case the setting up of an idol in the sanctuary would have to be taken to refer to the dedication of a temple of Zeus upon the consecrated ground of the Temple.
