= Assar Mossberg =

Swedish footballer

Personal information
- Full name: Assar Mossberg
- Position: Defender

Senior career*
Years	Team	Apps	(Gls)
1932–1938	Malmö FF	62	(1)
- * Club domestic league appearances and goals

Assar Mossberg was a Swedish footballer who played as a defender.
