= Khairallah Assar =

Prof. Dr. Khairallah Assar
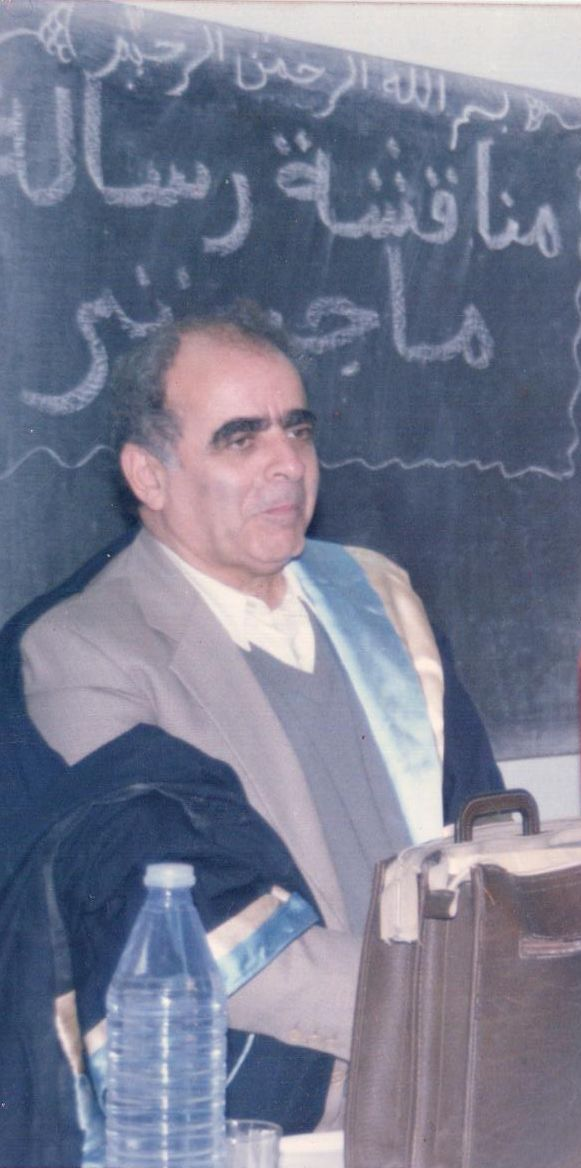
- Khairallah Assar at a MSc defense committee

Personal information
- Full name: Khairallah Ahmad Assar
- Born: May 23, 1935 Hama, Syria
- Died: April 28, 2015 (aged 79) Annaba, Algeria

Sport
- Sport: Skiing

Khairallah Ahmad Assar, Arabic: خيرالله أحمد عصار, (May 23, 1935, Hama, Syria - April 28, 2015) was professor of sociology at the University of Annaba, Algeria, from 1976 to 1996. Native of Hama in Syria, he studied at the American University of Beirut in 1956 and obtained his PhD from the University of Heidelberg, Germany, in 1964.

Dr Khairallah Assar provided an essential contribution in teaching and researching sociology at the University of Annaba. He published several books in Arabic, some of them being reedited and are considered as fundamental assets for post-graduate students at the University of Annaba, e.g. Arabic: محاضرات في منهجية البحث الإجتماعي ["Lectures in methodology for social research"]. He supervised 5 PhD dissertations and 15 MSc thesis at University of Annaba and other universities in Algeria. He was since 1982 an active member of the International Sociological Association and participated actively in seminars and activities organized by Pugwash Conferences on Science and World Affairs and ISODARCO. Since he retired in 1996, he was doing research on religious education and how religions are taught in children textbooks in collaboration with Prof. Johannes Lähnemann (University of Nürnberg, Germany). Before joining the University of Annaba, he taught philosophy, psychology and educational sciences in Hama, Syria (1965-1972), and in Algiers, Algeria (1972-1976).

Khairallah Assar was married to Elsie Benander, (January 12, 1940 - February 23, 1987), a woman from Höör, Sweden; they met at University of Gothenburg in 1961–62. They had together three children : Saïd (1963), Leila (1967) and Selma (1968).

== Books ==
- محاضرات و تطبيقات في علم النفس اللغوي ,ديوان المطبوعات الجامعية ,الجزائر ,1980 ["Lectures and applications in psycholinguistics", Office des Publications Universitaires, Algiers]
- محاضرات في منهجية البحث الإجتماعي ,ديوان المطبوعات الجامعية ,الجزائر ,1982 ["Lectures in methodology for social research", Office des Publications Universitaires, Algiers]
- مقدمة لعلم النفس الأدبي ,ديوان المطبوعات الجامعية ,الجزائر ,1982 ["Introduction to psychological study of literature", Office des Publications Universitaires, Algiers]
- مبادئ علم النفس الإجتماعي ,ديوان المطبوعات الجامعية ,الجزائر ,1984 / دار طلاس للنشر ,سورية ,1994 ["Principles of social psychology", Office des Publications Universitaires, Algiers]
- مدخل إلى قضايا التعليم في العلوم الإجتماعية ,ديوان المطبوعات الجامعية ,الجزائر ,1985 / دار طلاس للنشر ,سورية ,1993 ["Introduction to teaching issues in social sciences", Office des Publications Universitaires, Algiers / Tlass publications, Damascus, Syria]
- تعليم العربية للكبار ,دار طلاس للنشر ,سورية ,1996 ["Teaching Arabic to adults", Tlass publications, Damascus, Syria]
- مدخل إلى السبرنطيقا الإجتماعية ,محاولة التحكم بالسلوك الإجتماعي ,ديوان المطبوعات الجامعية ,الجزائر , 2002 ["Introduction to social cybernetics, a tentative to control social behavior", Office des Publications Universitaires, Algiers]
- 2003, Passion Flowers, Poems and Songs, Fischer editions, R.G. Fischer Verlag, ISBN 3-8301-0593-2.
- 2014, e-kutub, London, يوميات بعوضة كانت يوما في الجنة, "The Diary of a Mosquito", e-kutub Ltd., London]

== Some other publications ==
- Assar, Khairallah : Arabische Studenten an einer deutschen Universität : eine Untersuchung and der Universität Heidelberg, PhD thesis, Heidelberg University, 1964.
- Assar, Khairallah : An Attempt to Establish Islamic Logical Models for Social Research, Journal of the Social Sciences, vol. 15, n°1, Academic Publication Council-Kuwait University, 1987.
- Assar, Khairallah: "Configuration of Basic Values of Youth at an Algerian University", in Development Of Emerging World Youth, Simhadri, Yedla C, (Editor), Mittal Publications, 1989, p. 161-174.
- Arbatov G. (Author), Stürmer M. (Author), Tsipis K. (Author), Gottstein K. (Vorwort, Bearbeitung), Assar Kh. (Mitarbeiter), Burlando R. (Mitarbeiter), Du S. (Mitarbeiter), Fischer D. (Mitarbeiter), Freymond J.F. (Mitarbeiter), Gamba V. (Mitarbeiter), Hans A. (Mitarbeiter), Harjes H.P. (Mitarbeiter): Aspects of Security Policy in a New Europe: XIVth ISIDARCO Summer Course, Max-Planck-Ges. Forsch.-Stelle Gottstein (1994)
- Assar, Khairallah: "Peace Education and the Religions: An Analysis of the Algerian and the Syrian Experiences", published in J. Lähnemann (ed.): "Spirituatität und ethische Erziehung. Erbe und Herausforderung der Religionen”, Hamburg 2001, p. 165-172.
