= Tisha B'Av =

Annual fast day in Rabbinic Judaism

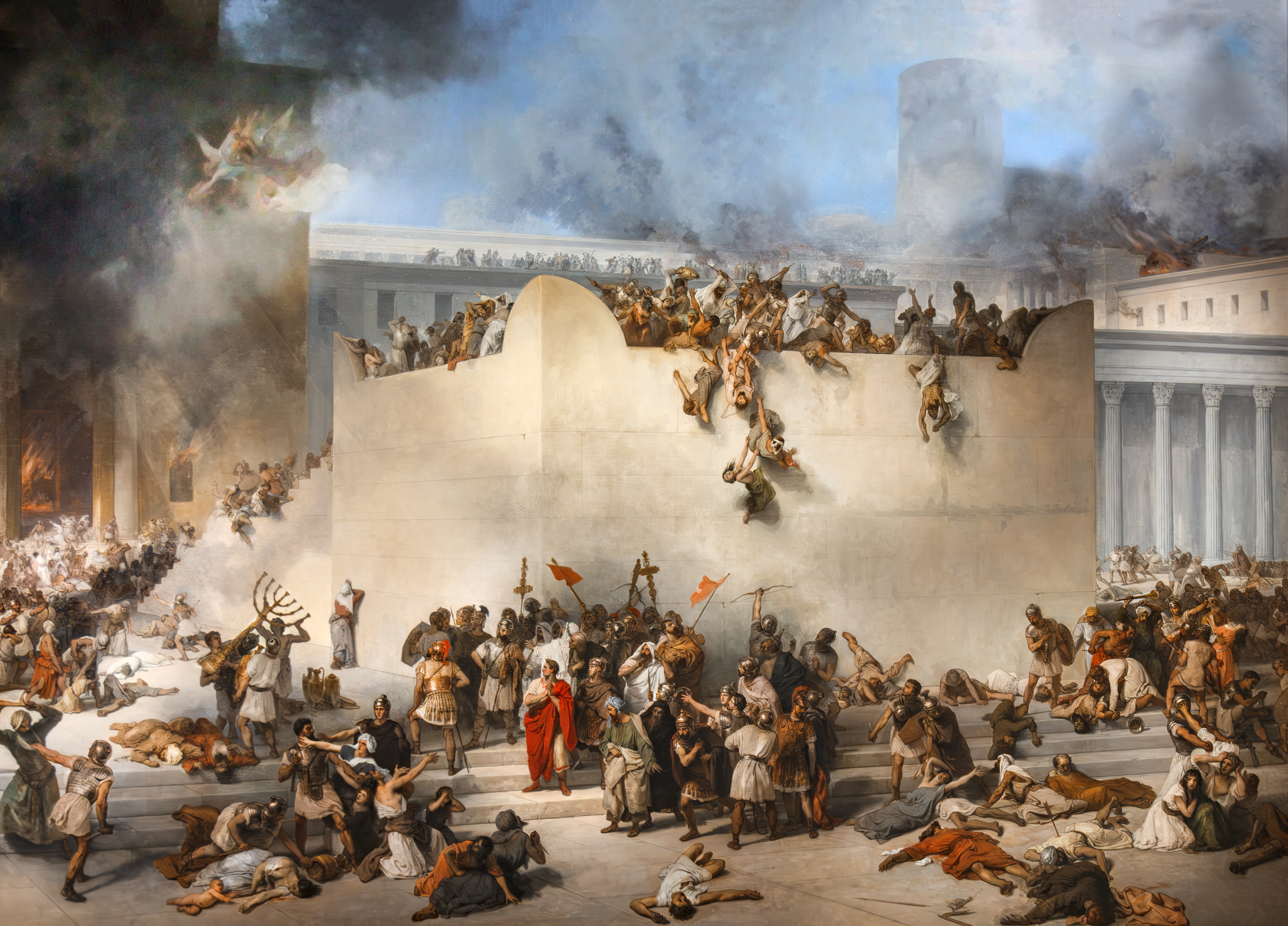
- The Destruction of the Temple of Jerusalem by Francesco Hayez, 1867
- Official name: Hebrew: תשעה באב; English: Ninth of Av
- Type: Jewish religious and national
- Significance: Mourning the destruction of the ancient Temples and Jerusalem, and other major calamities which have befallen the Jewish people.
- Observances: Fasting, mourning, prayer, abstaining from physical pleasures
- Date: 9th day of Av (if Shabbat, then the 10th of Av)
- 2025 date: Sunset, 2 August – nightfall, 3 August
- 2026 date: Sunset, 22 July – nightfall, 23 July
- 2027 date: Sunset, 11 August – nightfall, 12 August
- 2028 date: Sunset, 31 July – nightfall, 1 August
- Frequency: annual
- Related to: The fasts of Gedalia, the Tenth of Tevet and the Seventeenth of Tammuz, the Three Weeks & the Nine Days

Tisha B'Av (Hebrew: תִּשְׁעָה בְּאָב, romanized: Tišʿā bəʾĀḇ, lit. 'Ninth of Av' (Note: Also written ט׳ באב, using Hebrew numerals; Yiddish: תּישעה־באָבֿ, romanized: Tíshebov; Modern Hebrew IPA: [tiʃʕa beˈʔav])) is an annual ta'anit (fast day) in Rabbinic Judaism. (Karaite Judaism fasts on the 7th and 10th of Av.) The day commemorates a number of disasters in Jewish history, above all the destruction of both of the great temples in Jerusalem: Solomon's Temple, destroyed by the Neo-Babylonian Empire (in 587 BCE), and the Second Temple, destroyed by the Roman Empire (in 70 CE).

The Three Weeks, a period of Jewish communal sorrow, begins on the Seventeenth of Tammuz and ends on Tisha B'Av, a day regarded as "the saddest day in the Jewish calendar", mourning the loss of the two temples. It is categorized as a day destined for tragedy. Tisha b'Av falls in July or August in the Gregorian calendar.

Observances of the day include five prohibitions, most notable of which is a 25-hour fast. The Book of Lamentations, which mourns the destruction of Jerusalem, is read in synagogue, followed by the recitation of kinnot, liturgical dirges that lament the Israelites’ loss of the Temples and Jerusalem. As the day has become associated with remembrance of other major calamities which have befallen the Jewish people, some kinnot also recall events such as the murder of the Ten Martyrs by the Romans; expulsions from England, Spain, and elsewhere; massacres of numerous medieval Jewish communities by Crusaders; the Holocaust; and the October 7 attacks.

== History ==
=== Five calamities ===
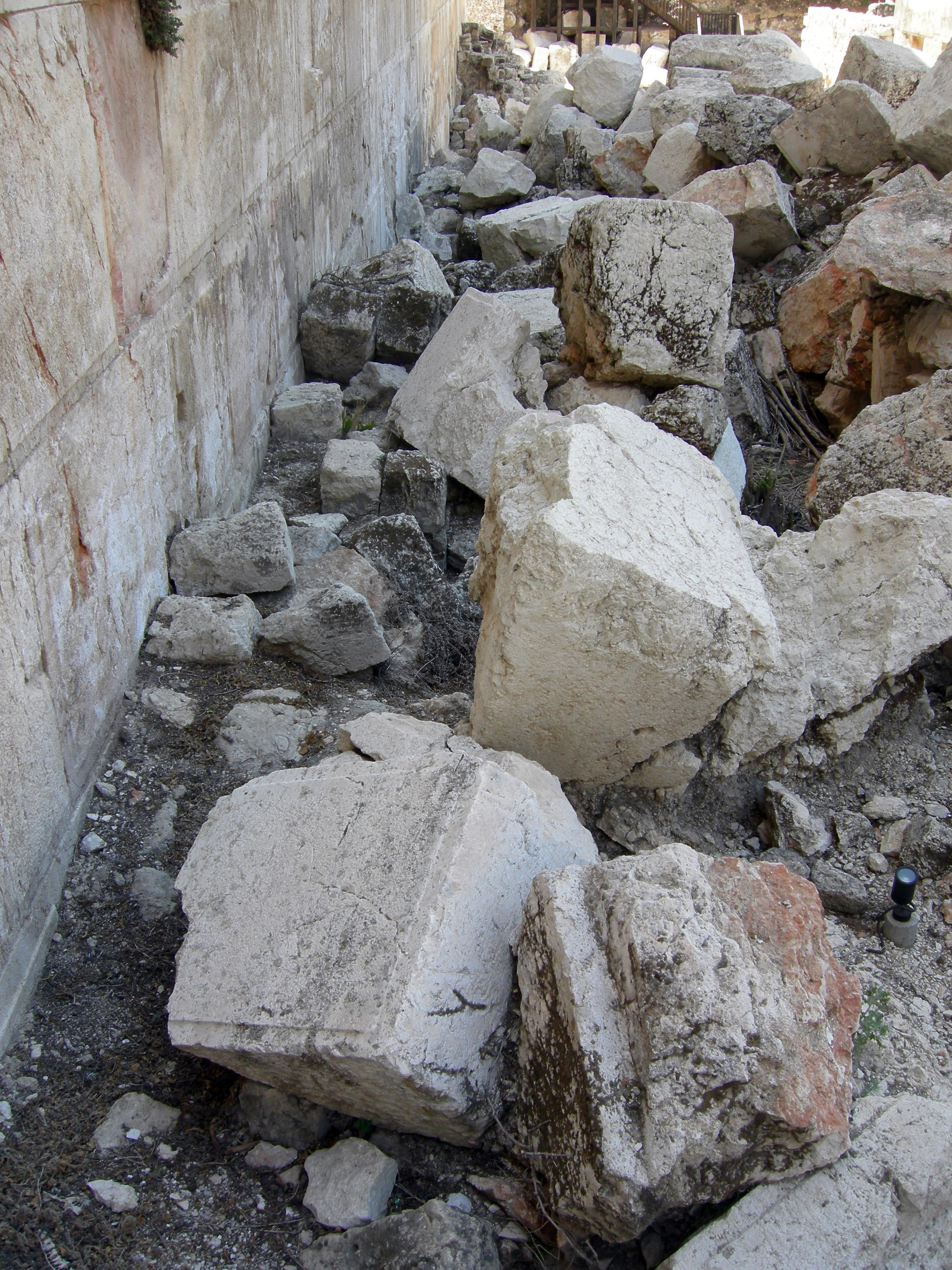
Excavated stones from the Western Wall of the Temple Mount, knocked onto the street below by Roman battering rams in the Siege of Jerusalem in 70 CE

According to the Mishnah, Taanit 4:6, five specific events occurred on the ninth of Av that warrant fasting:

1. The Twelve Spies sent by Moses to observe the land of Canaan returned from their mission. Only two of the spies, Joshua and Caleb, brought a positive report, while the others spoke disparagingly about the land. The majority report caused the Israelites to cry, panic and despair of ever entering the "Promised Land". For this, they were punished by God so that their generation would not enter the land. The midrash quotes God as saying about this event, "You cried before me pointlessly, I will fix for you [this day as a day of] crying for the generations", alluding to the future misfortunes which occurred on the same date.
2. The First Temple built by King Solomon was destroyed by Nebuchadnezzar II in the 587 BCE Siege of Jerusalem, and the population of the Kingdom of Judah was sent into the Babylonian captivity. According to the Hebrew Bible, the First Temple's destruction began on the 7th of Av (2 Kings 25:8) and continued until the 10th (Jeremiah 52:12). According to the Talmud, Ta'anit 29a, the actual destruction of the Temple began on the Ninth of Av, and it continued to burn throughout the Tenth of Av.
3. The Second Temple, built by Zerubbabel and renovated by Herod the Great, was destroyed by the Romans on 9 Av in 70 CE, (Note: Secular chronology gives the year as 70 CE. Some versions of rabbinic chronology give the year as 68 CE. See Missing years (Jewish calendar)#Two-year difference within the Hebrew calendar for elaboration.) scattering the people of Judea and commencing the greatest Jewish diaspora.
4. The Romans subsequently crushed the Bar Kokhba revolt and destroyed the city of Betar, killing over 500,000 Jewish civilians (approximately 580,000) on 9 Av in 135 CE.
5. Following the Bar Kokhba revolt, Roman commander Quintus Tineius Rufus plowed the site of the Temple in Jerusalem and the surrounding area.

=== Other calamities ===
Over time, Tisha b'Av has evolved into a Jewish day of mourning, not only for these events, but also for subsequent tragedies that occurred on or near the 9th of Av. References to some of these events appear in liturgy composed for Tisha b'Av (see below). Note that dates prior to 1582 are in the Julian calendar, not the Gregorian calendar.

- The First Crusade officially commenced on 15 August 1096 (Av 24, AM 4856), and began with the Rhineland massacres targeting Jews as "resident aliens", killing 10,000 Jews in its first month and annihilating Jewish communities in France and the Rhineland.
- The Jews were expelled from England on 18 July 1290 (Av 9, AM 5050).
- The Jews were expelled from France on 22 July 1306 (Av 10, AM 5066).
- The Alhambra Decree by the Catholic Monarchs of Spain expelled Jews from Spanish-ruled territories on 31 July 1492 (Av 7, AM 5252).
- Germany entered World War I on 1–2 August 1914 (Av 9–10, AM 5674), which caused massive upheaval in European Jewry and whose aftermath led to World War II and the Holocaust.
- On 31 July 1941 (Av 7, AM 5701) Reinhard Heydrich, architect of the Holocaust, receives the order from Nazi leadership to "mak[e] all necessary preparations with regard to organisational and financial matters for bringing about a Total Solution of the Jewish Question." This order will culminate in the murder of approximately one-third of world's Jewish population.
- On 23 July 1942 (Av 9, AM 5702), the mass deportation of Jews from the Warsaw Ghetto to the Treblinka extermination camp began.
- The AMIA bombing on the Jewish community center in Buenos Aires, killed 85 and injured 300 on 18 July 1994 (10 Av, AM 5754).

While the Holocaust spanned a number of years, religious communities use Tisha b'Av to mourn its 6,000,000 Jewish victims, either in addition to or instead of the secular Holocaust memorial days such as Yom HaShoah. On Tisha b'Av, communities that otherwise do not modify the traditional prayer liturgy have added the recitation of special kinnot related to the Holocaust.

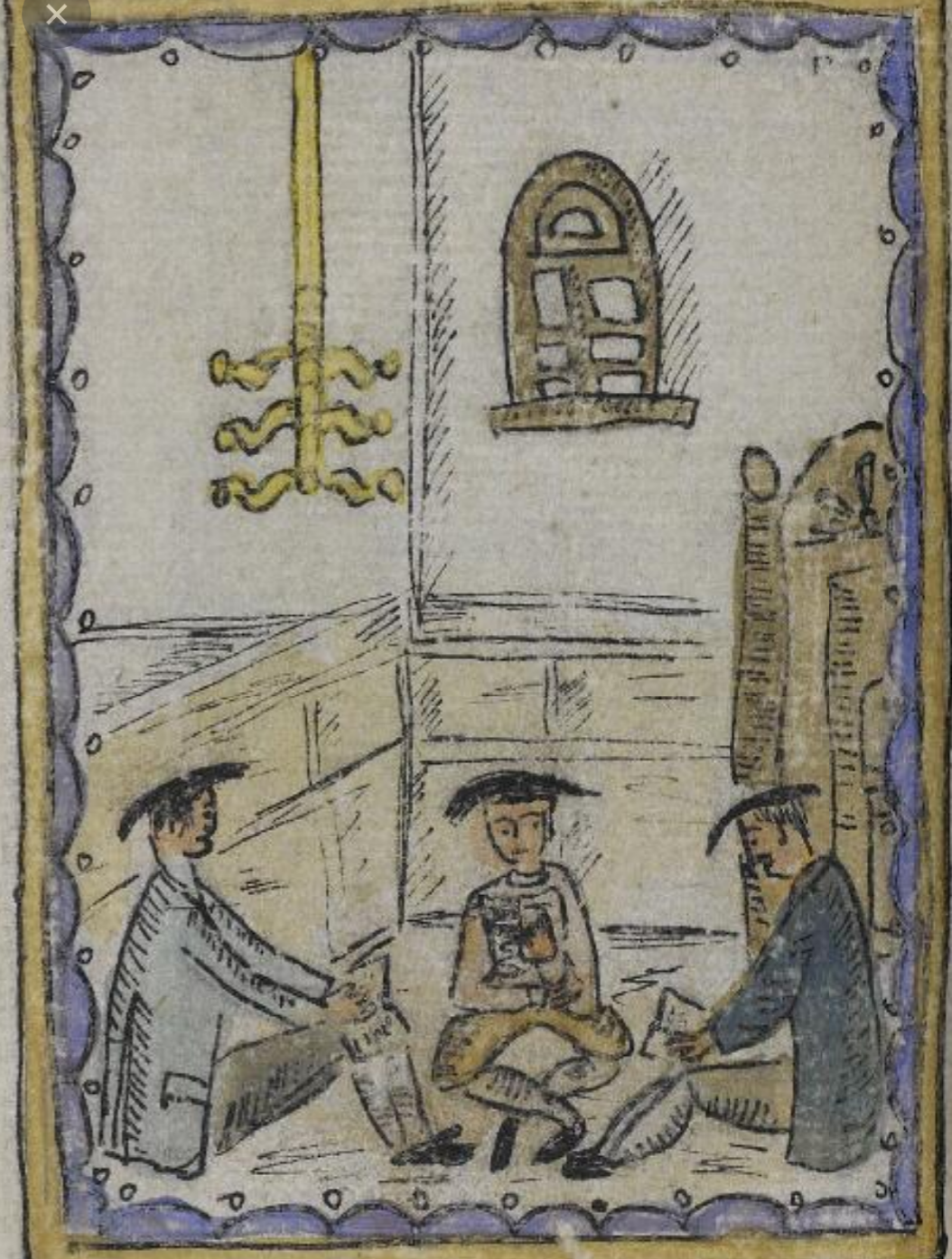
Tisha b'Av prayers (1740)

Similarly, within Religious Zionist communities, the 2005 Israeli disengagement from the Gaza Strip is mourned on Tisha b'Av as well, a practice supported by Religious Zionist rabbis like Yaakov Ariel and Dov Lior. Kinnot have been composed about the withdrawal, and the connection to Tisha b'Av was emphasized in ten-year anniversary commemorations. Although the disengagement operation had been delayed specifically to avoid coinciding with The Three Weeks and Tisha b'Av, the timing lent itself to symbolic interpretation both by Religious Zionists and by wider Jewish culture. However, even within Religious Zionism, Chaim Navon holds that the disengagement did not rise to the level of a calamity and Shlomo Aviner has written that mourning the disengagement on Tisha b'Av is forbidden because it incites political division. Yona Metzger, then Ashkenazi Chief Rabbi of Israel, ruled in 2006 that the disengagement was a tragedy but mourning rituals should not be integrated into Tisha b'Av, while Howard Jachter, a prominent Orthodox scholar who is a member of the Rabbinical Council of America, permits it in narrow fashion.

Kinnot regarding the October 7 attacks have also been added to the Tisha B'Av liturgy.

=== Related observances ===
In connection with the fall of Jerusalem, three other fast-days were established at the same time as the Ninth Day of Av: these were the Tenth of Tevet, when the siege of Jerusalem by the Babylonians began; the Seventeenth of Tammuz, when the first breach was made in the wall by the Romans; and the Third of Tishrei, known as the Fast of Gedalia, the day Gedaliah was assassinated in the time of the Neo-Babylonian Empire following the destruction of the First Temple. The period from the Seventeenth of Tammuz leading up to Tisha b'Av is known as The Three Weeks, while the period from the First of Av leading up to Tisha b'Av is known as The Nine Days.

== Laws and customs ==
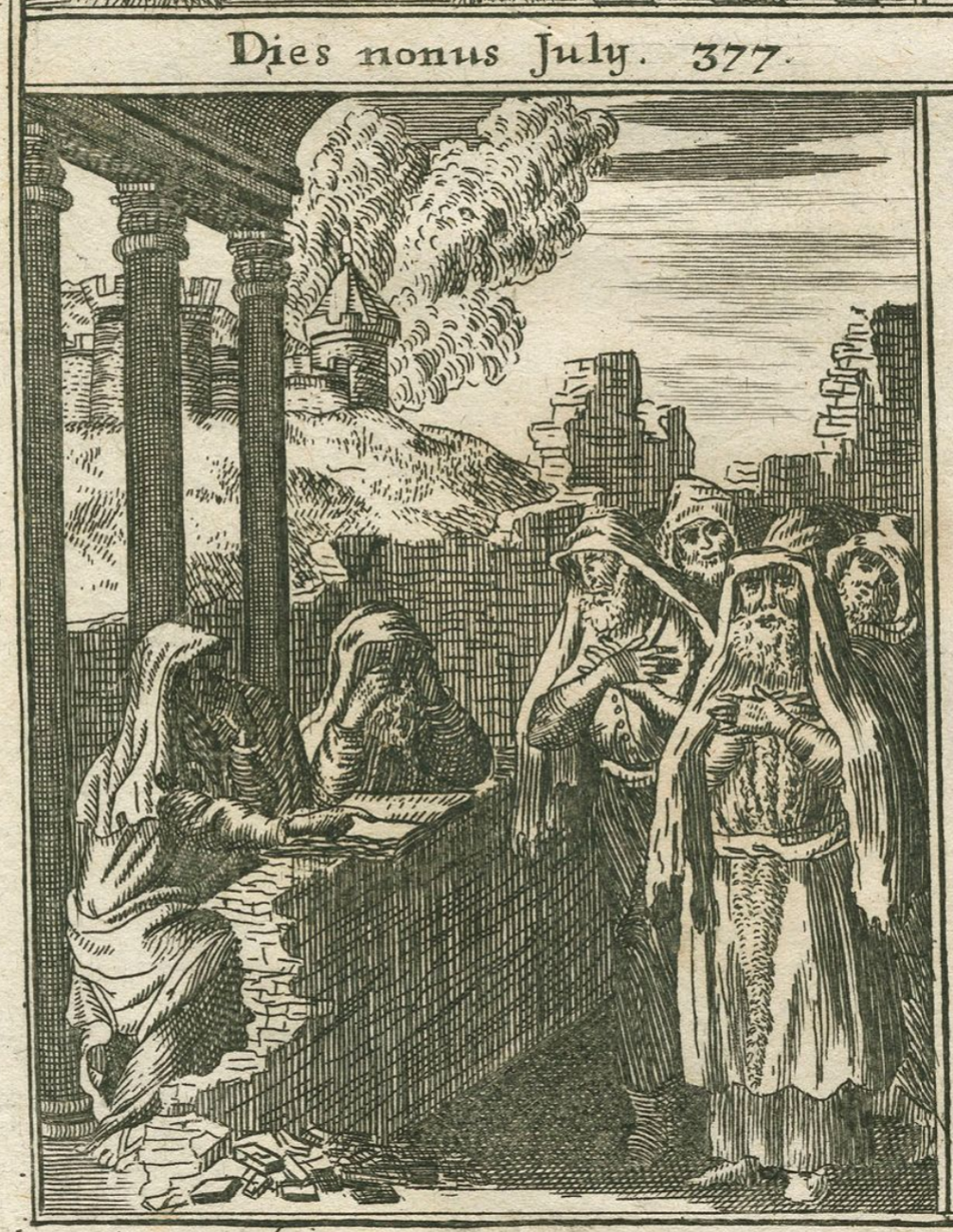
Tisha b'Av (1657 woodcut)

Tisha b'Av falls in July or August in the Gregorian calendar. When Tisha b'Av falls on Shabbat, it then is nidḥā (נִדְחָה "delayed"). Thus the observance of Tisha b'Av can take place on the following day (that is, Sunday). This last occurred in 2022, and will next occur in 2029. No mourning can intrude upon the Sabbath. Normally, Sabbath eating and drinking end just before sunset Saturday evening rather than nightfall.

This fast lasts just over 25 hours, beginning at sunset on the preceding evening, lasting until nightfall the next day. Pleasurable activities are forbidden.

=== Main prohibitions ===
Tisha b'Av bears a stringent nature alike that of Yom Kippur. The length of a fast that lasts over 25 hours, beginning before sunset on the eve of Tisha b'Av and ends at nightfall the following day, Tisha b'Av mandates the following five prohibitions:

1. No eating or drinking;
2. No washing or bathing;
3. No application of creams or oils;
4. No wearing of (leather) shoes;
5. No marital (sexual) relations.

These restrictions are waived in the case of health issues. A competent posek, a rabbi who decides Jewish Law, must be consulted. Those who are ill will be allowed to eat and drink. On other fast days, almost any medical condition can justify breaking the fast; in practice, consultation with a rabbi is best. Ritual hand washing up to the knuckles is permitted. Washing to cleanse dirt or mud from one's body is also permitted.

=== Additional customs ===
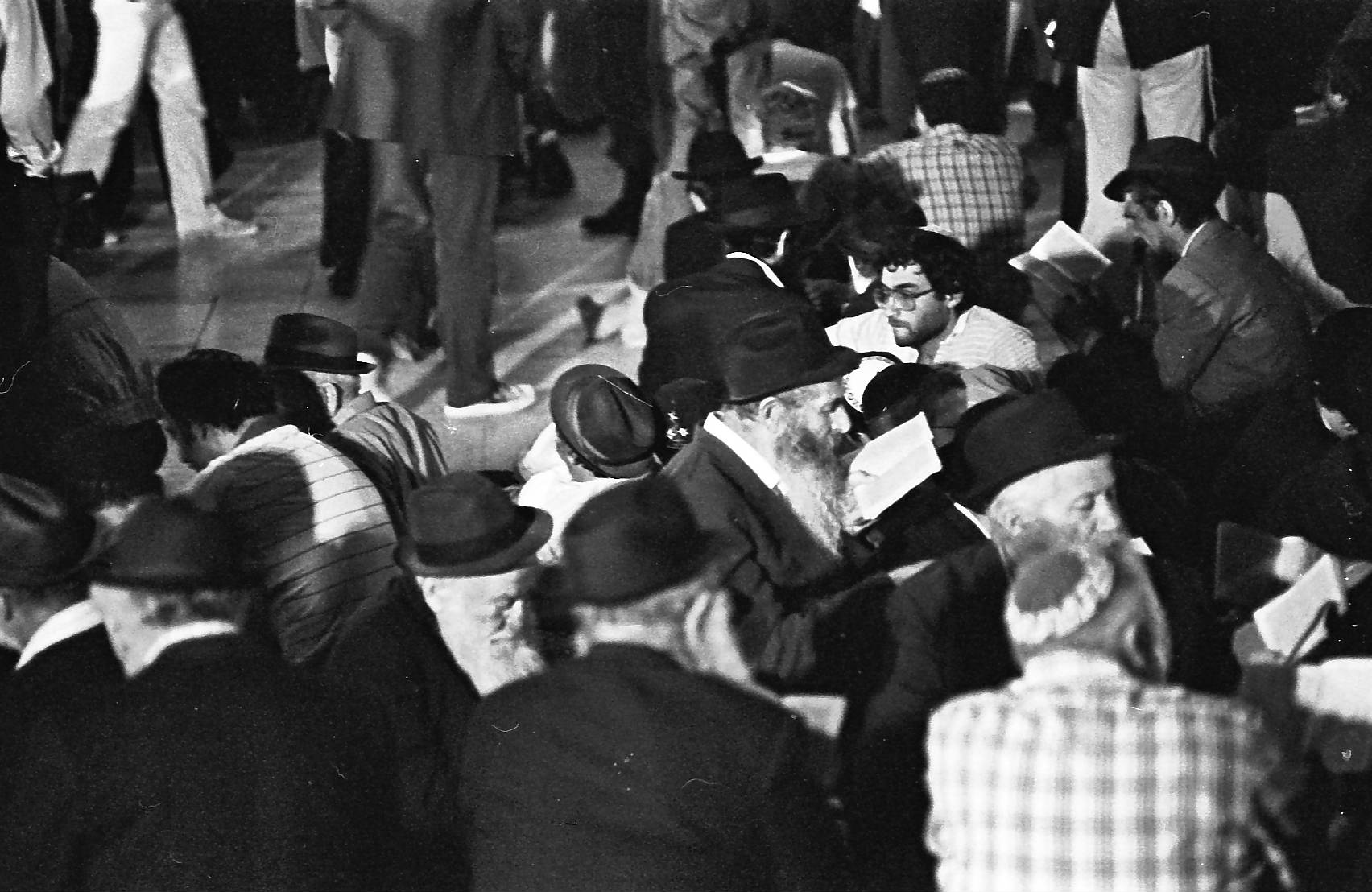
Reading kinnot at the Western Wall

Torah study is forbidden on Tisha b'Av (as it is considered an enjoyable activity), except for the study of distressing texts in the Tanakh (Hebrew Bible) such as the Book of Lamentations, the Book of Job, and portions of Jeremiah, as well as chapters of the Talmud that discuss the laws of mourning and those that discuss the destruction of the Temple in Jerusalem.

In synagogue, prior to the commencement of the evening services, the parochet, which normally covers and adorns the Torah ark, is removed or drawn aside until the Mincha prayer service. Spanish and Portuguese Jews, who do not hang a curtain in front of the ark during the rest of the year, place a black curtain over the ark for Tisha b'Av. The use of black as well as the sadness of the day has led to the day to be referred to as the Black Fast.

According to Moses Isserles, it is customary to sit on low stools or on the floor, as is done during shiva (the first week of mourning), from the meal immediately before the fast (the seudah hamafseket) until midday (chatzot hayom) of the fast itself. It is customary to eat a hard-boiled egg dipped in ashes and a piece of bread dipped into ashes during this pre-fast meal. The Beit Yosef rules that the custom to sit low to the ground extends past mid-day until one prays Mincha (the afternoon prayer).

The custom is to dim the lighting and to read the kinnot by candlelight. Some sleep on the floor or modify their normal sleeping routine, for instance, by sleeping without a pillow (or with one fewer pillow than usual). People refrain from greeting each other or sending gifts on this day. Old siddurim and Torah scrolls are often buried on this day.

The custom is not to put on tefillin nor tallit for Shacharit. Men wear only tallit katan without a blessing. At mincha, tzitzit and tefilin are worn, with proper blessings before donning them.

=== End of fast ===
The laws of Tisha b'Av as observed by Orthodox Jews are recorded in Orach Chayim 552–557.

Although the fast ends at nightfall, according to tradition the First Temple continued burning throughout the night and for most of the following day, the tenth of Av. It is therefore customary to maintain all restrictions of the nine days through midday (chatzos) of the following day according to Shulchan Aruch with Mishnah Brurah 558:1.

When Tisha b'Av falls on a Saturday, and is therefore observed on Sunday, the 10th of Av, it is not necessary to wait until midday Monday to end restrictions of the nine days. However, one refrains from involvement in activity that would be considered "joyous", such as eating meat, drinking wine, listening to music, and saying the "shehecheyonu" blessing, until Monday morning. One can wash laundry and shave immediately after the end of a delayed Tisha b'Av.

The Kitzur Shulchan Aruch 125:6 instructs that when Tisha b'Av begins on Saturday night, Havdalah is postponed by 24 hours, as one could not drink the accompanying wine. One says Attah Chonantanu in the Saturday night Amidah or says Baruch Hamavdil, thus ending Shabbat. A blessing is made on the candles on Saturday night. After Tisha b'Av ends on Sunday evening, the Havdalah ceremony is performed with wine (without candle or spices)

== Prayer service ==
=== Scriptural readings ===
"Console, O Lord, the mourners of Zion and Jerusalem and the city laid waste, despised and desolate. In mourning for she is childless, her dwellings laid waste, despised in the downfall of her glory and desolate through the loss of her inhabitants…. Legions have devoured her, worshippers of strange gods have possessed her. They have put the people of Israel to the sword… Therefore let Zion weep bitterly and Jerusalem give forth her voice… For You, O Lord, did consume her with fire and with fire will You in future restore her… Blessed are You, O Lord, Who consoles Zion and builds Jerusalem."

— Abbreviated from the Nachem prayer.

The Book of Lamentations is read in synagogue during the evening services.

In many Sephardic congregations, the Book of Job is read on the morning of Tisha b'Av.

Those called to the Torah reading on Tisha b'Av are not given the usual congratulations for this honor. There is also a tradition that those who were called to read from the Torah or Haftara in the Tisha b'Av morning service are also called to read in the afternoon service, because the morning readings are filled with calamity and the afternoon readings contain words of consolation.

=== Kinnot ===
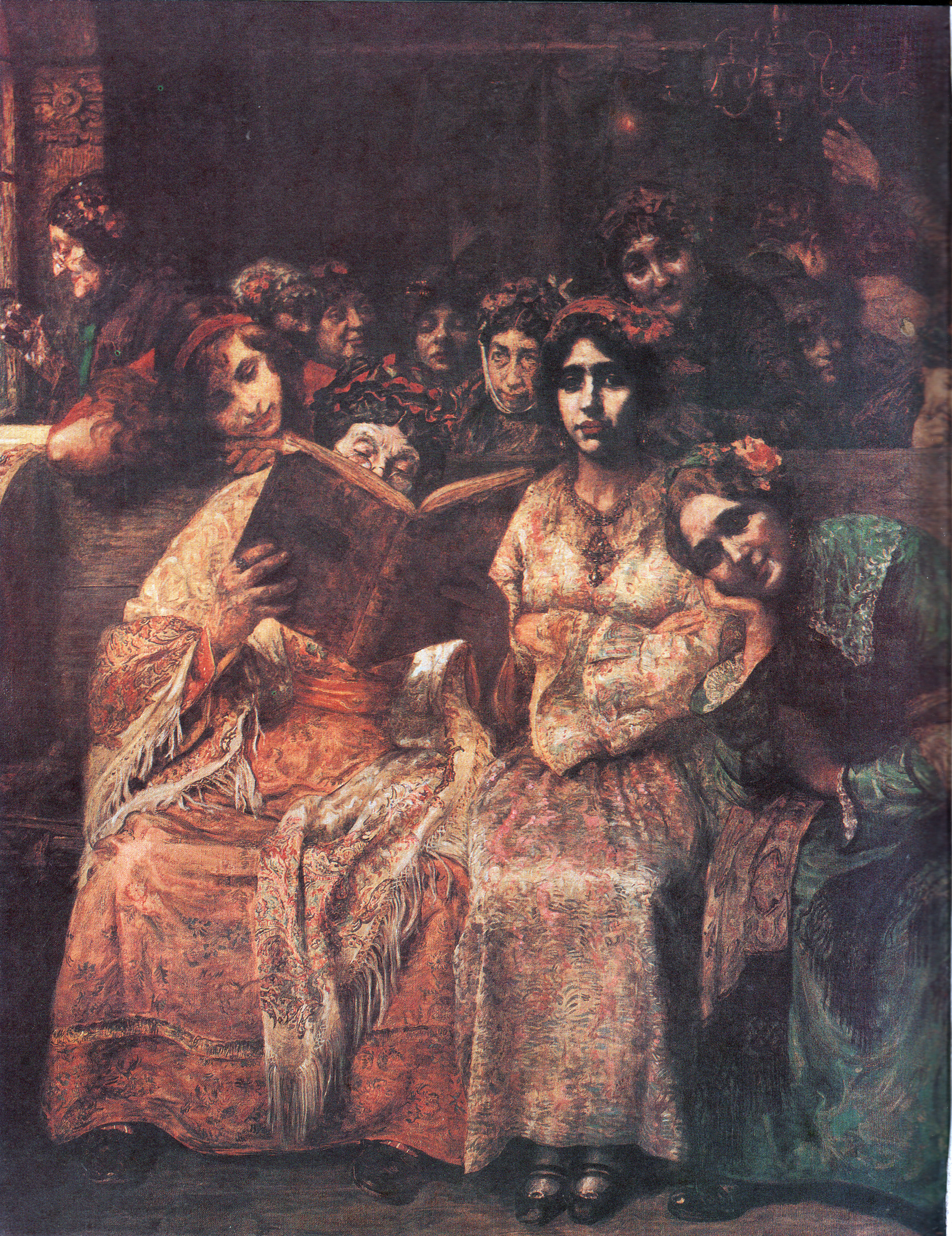
Remembrance of the Destruction, showing women reading the Book of Lamentations, painting by Leopold Pilichowski (1925)

Most of the morning is spent chanting or reading kinnot, bewailing the loss of the Temples and subsequent persecutions, as well as referring to post-exile disasters. Later, kinnot were composed by various poets, often prominent rabbis, who had suffered in the events mentioned. Important kinnot were composed by Eleazar beRabbi Qallir and Judah Halevi. After the Holocaust, kinnot were composed by the German-born rabbi Shimon Schwab in 1959, at the request of Joseph Breuer, and by Solomon Halberstam, the second Bobover rebbe in 1984. Since Israeli disengagement from the Gaza Strip, some segments of the Religious Zionist community have begun to recite kinnot to commemorate the expulsion of Israeli settlers from Gush Katif and the northern West Bank on the day after Tisha b'Av, in 2005.

After the October 7 attacks, kinnot were added to commemorate them, including "Tisha b'Av Lament for October 7", published by the Orthodox Union. and "Kinah for the Events of Swords of Iron", written by Rabbi Yosef Zvi Rimon. Another example is "A Lament for Be'eri", written by Yagel Harush, which has been translated into English and whose first stanza begins (echoing the Hebrew word Eicha -- "How" -- that starts the Book of Lamentations):

How did Be’eri / turn into my tomb
The day of my light / to the day of my gloom
Its songs silenced/ trampled fruit and leaf
My eyes well with tears / from the depth of my grief

=== Nachem ===
A paragraph that begins Nachem (meaning "console") is added to the conclusion of the blessing Boneh Yerushalayim ("Who builds Jerusalem") recited during the Amidah (for Ashkenazim, only at the Mincha service). The modified blessing opens "Lord our God, console the mourners of Zion and the mourners of Jerusalem and the city that is bereaved, destroyed, scorned and desolate". The concluding signature of the blessing is also extended to say "Blessed are You, O Lord, Who consoles Zion and builds Jerusalem."

Various Modern Orthodox and Conservative rabbis have proposed amending Nachem, as its wording no longer reflects the existence of a rebuilt Jerusalem under Israeli sovereignty after the Six-Day War. Chief Rabbi Shlomo Goren, for example, issued a revised wording of the prayer that eliminated references to Jerusalem's desolation. Rabbi Hayim David HaLevi proposed putting the prayer's verbs relating to the Temple's destruction into the past tense. However, such proposals have not been widely adopted.

== History of the observance ==
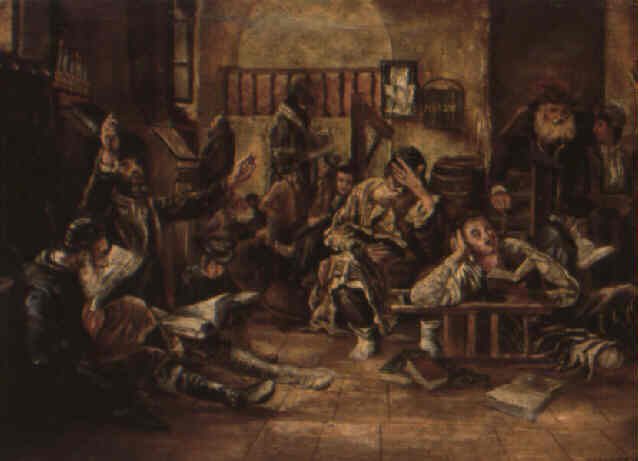
Lamenting in the synagogue, 1887

=== Roman and Byzantine periods ===
In the long period which is reflected in Talmudic literature, the observance of Tisha b'Av assumed a character of constantly growing sadness and asceticism.

Following the Bar Kokhba revolt, the Romans had forbidden Jews from entering the city of Jerusalem—which was razed and rebuilt as the colonia of Aelia Capitolina—and from residing in the former region of Roman Judaea, now part of Syria Palaestina. By the era of the Byzantine Empire, which had recently adopted Christianity as the state religion and controlled the city, this blanket ban remained. The only exception was evidently on the annual commemoration of Tisha b'Av, when Jews made a pilgrimage to the former city to mourn the destruction of the Temple. Under Hadrian, Jews were further banned from ascending to the Temple Mount to pray on Tisha B'av; instead, they prayed on the Mount of Olives overlooking it. Later, however, Jews were allowed to visit the Temple Mount.

Two independent accounts in non-Jewish sources describe these annual pilgrimages:

The first account is found in the anonymous Latin travelogue, the Itinerarium Burdigalense, which is dated to 333. The Bordeaux Pilgrim described a "perforated stone" on the Temple Mount, which the Jews "anoint"—i.e., rub with oil—once a year. While the Bordeaux Pilgrim stood in front of the stone, he heard the Jews lamenting and saw them tearing their clothes.

The second account is by Jerome, who spent time in Aelia after moving from Rome to Bethlehem in the late 4th century. Jerome was a prolific writer, and in the early 5th century, he wrote commentaries on the Twelve Minor Prophets, including Zephaniah. In his commentary on Zephaniah 1:16, Jerome described the mourning practices on the Temple Mount, including how Jews had to bribe Roman soldiers for permission to lament there. He also described Roman soldiers demanding additional money from elderly Jews, who were weeping, had disheveled hair, and wore garments that looked both worn out and torn.

Over the centuries, the observance of the day had lost much of its gloom. The blanket ban on Jews in Aelia and its environs finally ended in 637 with the early Muslim conquest of Aelia, which had Jewish military assistance.

=== Medieval and early modern developments ===
A growing strictness in observing mourning customs in connection with Tisha b'Av became pronounced after late antiquity, particularly during the early modern period (15th to the 18th centuries), one of the darkest periods for Jews.

The Andalusi refugee Maimonides wrote in the Mishneh Torah (Hilchoth Ta'anith 5:8) in the 12th century that the restrictions as to the eating of meat and the drinking of wine refer only to the last meal before fasting on the Eighth Day of Av if taken after noon, but before noon, anything may be eaten.

A gradual extension of prohibitions can be traced in the abstention from marrying at this season and in other signs of mourning. Moses ben Jacob of Coucy wrote in the 13th century that it is the universal custom to refrain from meat and wine during the whole day preceding 9 Av in the Sefer Mitzvoth ha-Gadol (Venice ed, Laws of Tishah B'Av, 249b). He also said that some do not wear tefillin on the morning of 9 Av, a custom that was later universally observed (its use is now postponed until the afternoon).

In 1481, Meshullam of Volterra reported that Jews ascended the Mount of Olives on Tisha B'Av to mourn the destruction of the Temple.

Joseph Karo wrote in his 16th century Orach Hayyim that some are accustomed to abstain from meat and wine from the beginning of the week in which the Ninth Day of Av falls; and still others abstain throughout the three weeks from the Seventeenth of Tammuz.

In this manner, many customs originally designated as marks of unusual piety finally became the rule for most Jews.

== Contemporary observance ==
=== In Israel ===
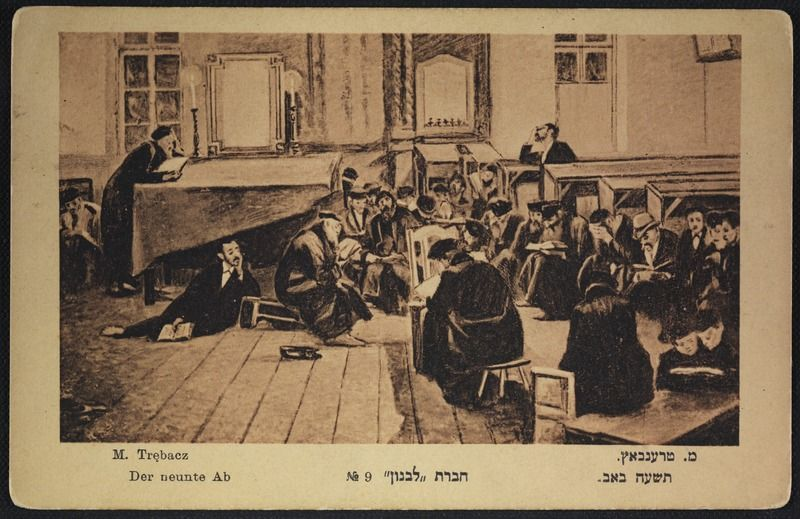
Tisha B'av by Maurycy Trębacz, 1903.

A 2010 poll in Israel revealed that some 22% of Israeli Jews fast on Tisha b'Av, and 52% said they forego recreational activity on this day even though they do not fast. Another 18% of Israeli Jews responded that if recreational spots were permissible to be open, they would go out on the eve of the fast day, and labelled the current legal status "religious coercion". The last 8% declined to answer.

In Israel, restaurants and places of entertainment are closed on the eve of Tisha b'Av and the following day by law. Establishments that break the law are subject to fines. When Menachem Begin became Prime Minister, he wanted to unite all the memorial days and days of mourning on Tisha b'Av, so that Yom HaShoah and Yom HaZikaron would also fall on this day, but it was not accepted.

Outside of Israel, the day is not observed by most secular Jews, as opposed to Yom Kippur, on which many secular Jews fast and go to synagogue.

According to halakha, combat soldiers are absolved of fasting on Tisha b'Av on the basis that it can endanger their lives. As of August 2025, the latest example of such a ruling was issued by the Military Rabbinate for the Gaza war.

=== In relation to the creation of the State of Israel ===
Following the Six-Day War, the national religious community viewed Israel's territorial conquests with almost messianic overtones. The conquest of geographical areas with immense religious significance, including Jerusalem, the Western Wall, and the Temple Mount, was seen as portentous. However, only the full rebuilding of the Temple would provide sufficient reason to cease observing the day as one of mourning and transform it into a day of joy instead.

=== Progressive Judaism ===
Because the destruction of the ancient Temples is not assigned a central religious role within many progressive (non-Orthodox) denominations of Judaism, "many Jews understand Tishah B'Av as a day to remember many tragedies that have befallen the Jewish people throughout history, and to reflect on the suffering that still occurs in our world." However, Reconstructing Judaism teaches, "On Tisha B’Av, the ninth day of the month of Av, we mourn the destruction of the first and second Temples and for numerous other events that befell our people throughout the ages. Together, we lament ancient and current suffering of our people and all people around the world." Conservative Judaism also observes it as a traditional ta'anit and mourning day.

Reform rabbi Stephen Lewis Fuchs asserted that it can mark both mourning Jewish suffering and celebrating Jewish resilience. While the Classical Reform position has discouraged observance of Tisha b'Av, and many Reform temples still do not observe it, some New Reform synagogues do observe Tisha b'Av. Lawrence A. Hoffman has described the contemporary Reform stance on Tisha b'Av as "ambivalent and complicated". Some Reform Jews who observe Tisha b'Av frame their observance through the lens of social justice or progressive Zionism.

The creation of the State of Israel played a significant role in shaping the Conservative Jewish approach to Tisha b'Av. Historically, Tisha b'Av was rarely discussed or observed in the Conservative movement until the 1940s, when Camp Ramah was founded by the Jewish Theological Seminary of America. The Zionist stance of Camp Ramah emphasized the importance of observing Tisha b'Av. Some Conservative Jews feel ambivalent towards Tisha b'Av or have abandoned it because the contemporary city of Jerusalem is thriving and is not in ruins. However, the large majority of Conservative synagogues maintain observance of Tisha b'Av.

== Other traditions ==
Iranian Jews refer to this holiday as Noi (pronounced No-ee), which possibly comes from the Persian word “noh” meaning nine. The eve of Tisha b'Av is similarly referred to as Shab-e Noi, meaning night of Noi. Another possible origin of the name is the Persian word نوحه (nohe), meaning "lament" in reference to the day's mournful character.

== See also ==
- Jewish holidays
