= Seventeenth of Tammuz =

Jewish fast day

- Official name: Hebrew: שבעה עשר בתמוז
- Type: Jewish religious and national
- Significance: Date when the walls of Jerusalem were breached
- Observances: Fasting, prayer
- Date: 17th day of Tammuz
- 2025 date: 13 July
- 2026 date: 2 July
- 2027 date: 22 July
- 2028 date: 11 July
- Related to: The fasts of the Tenth of Tevet and Tisha B'Av, the Three Weeks and the Nine Days

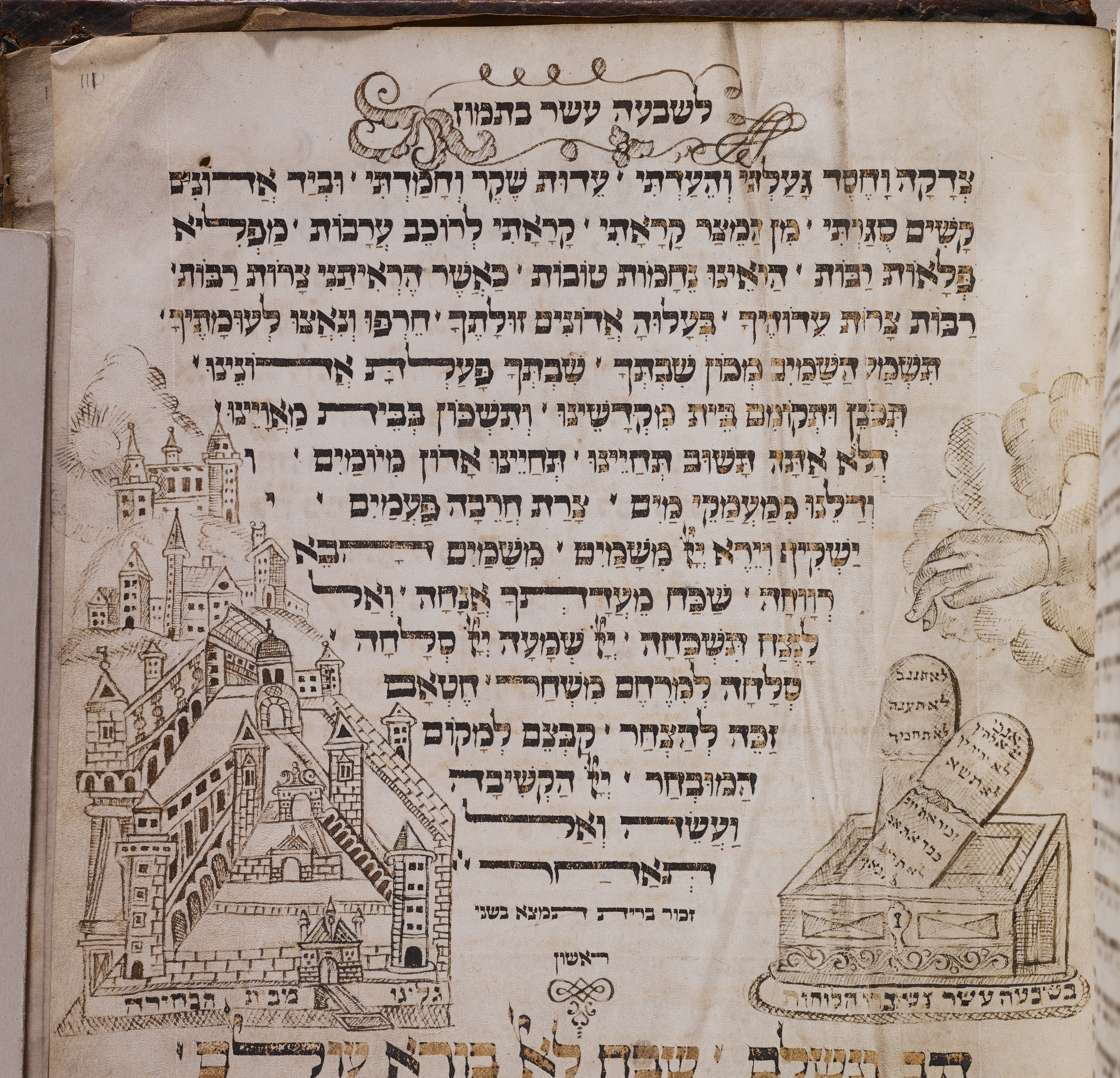
Selichot for 17 Tammuz in a 1724 illuminated book.

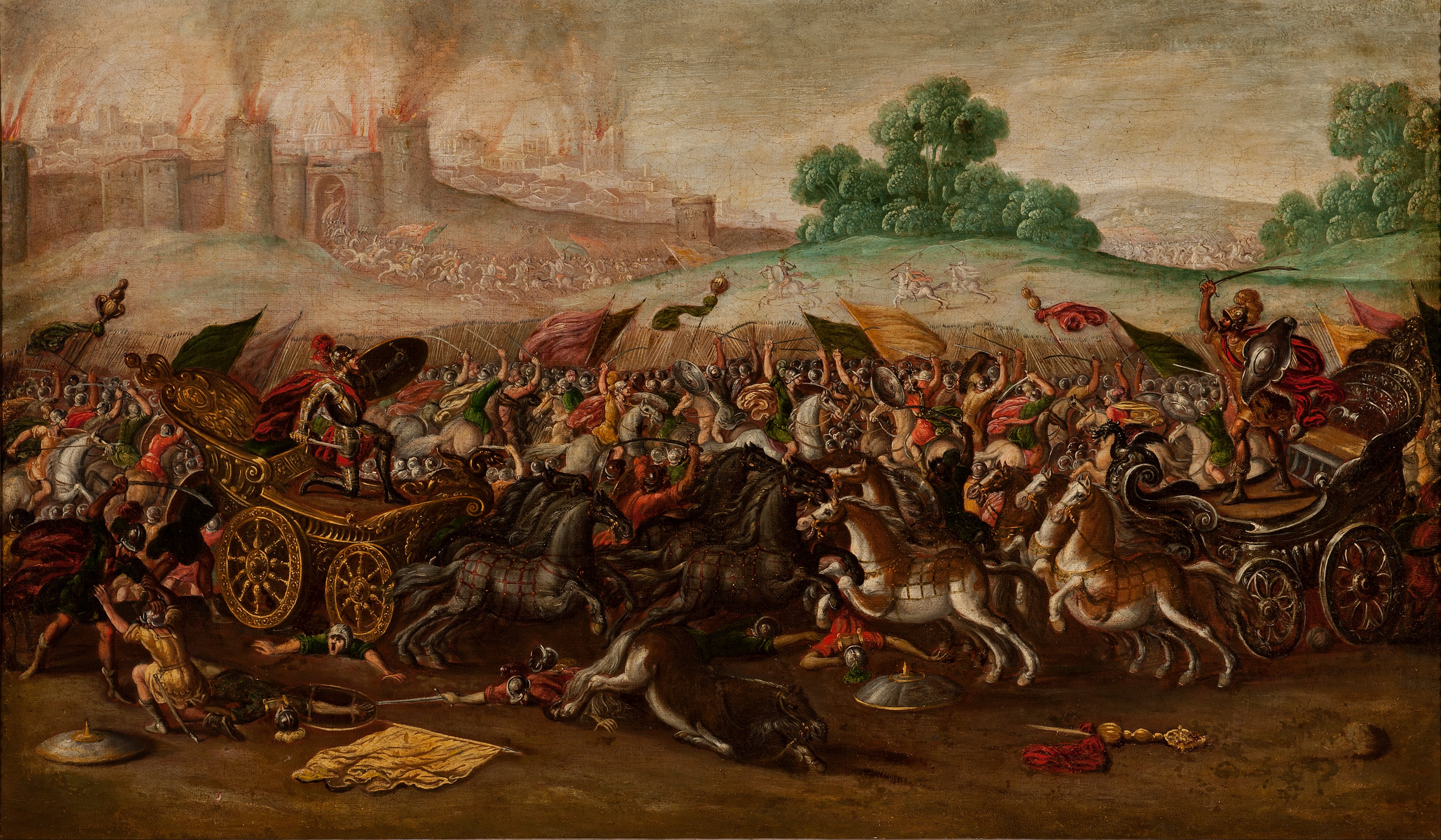
Nebuchadnezzar's army burns Jerusalem. (c. 1630–1660)

The Seventeenth of Tammuz (Biblical Hebrew: שִׁבְעָה עָשָׂר בְּתַמּוּז, Modern: Shiv'á Asár beTammúz, Tiberian (SBL): Šib̲ʿāʿāśār bəṯammuz) is a Jewish fast day commemorating the breach of the walls of Jerusalem before the destruction of the Second Temple. It falls on the 17th day of the Hebrew month of Tammuz, the fourth month, and marks the beginning of The Three Weeks, a mourning period leading up to Tisha B'Av.

The day also traditionally commemorates the destruction of the two tablets of the Ten Commandments and other historical calamities that befell the Jewish people on the same date.

== History ==
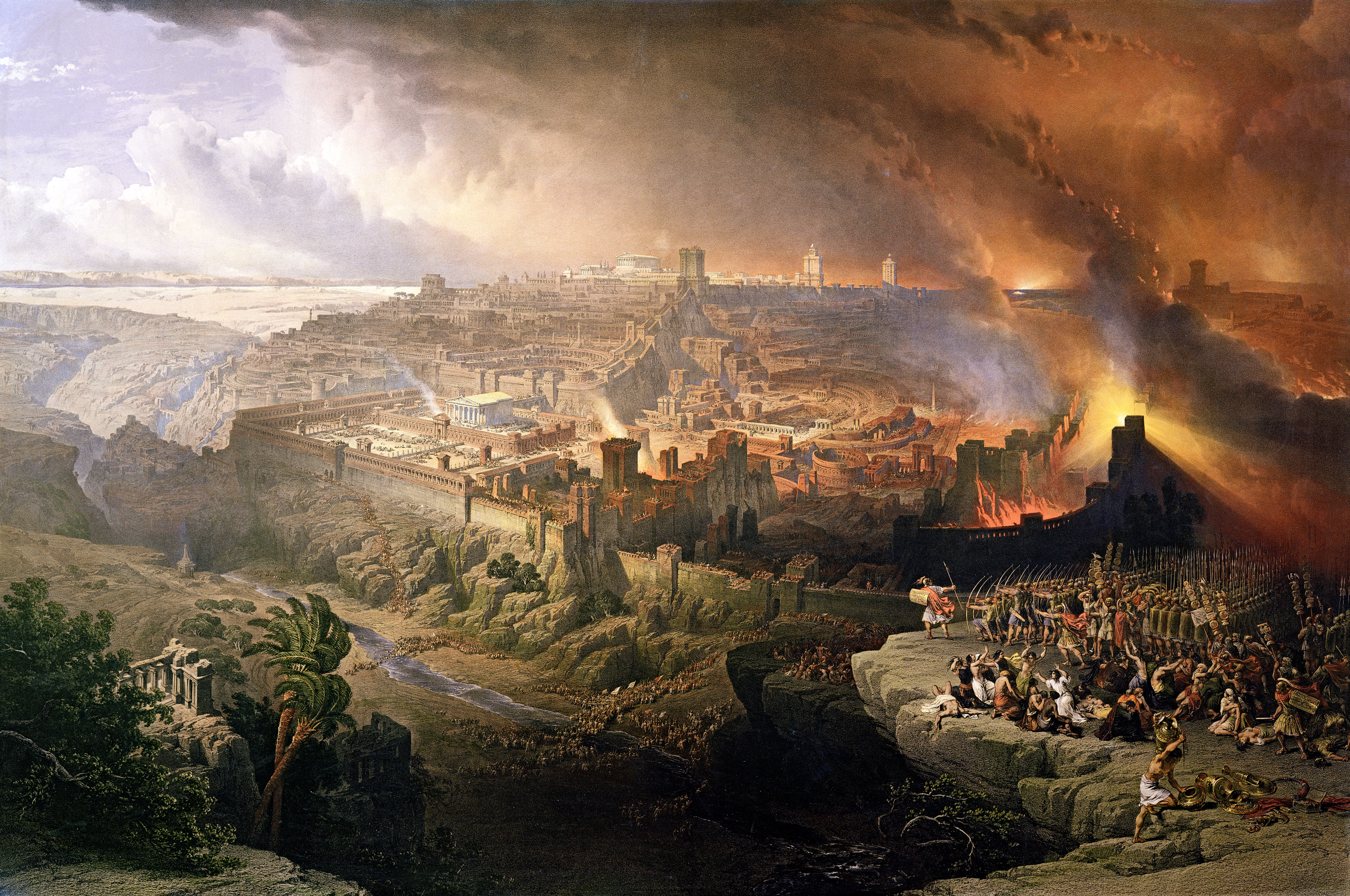
"The Siege and Destruction of Jerusalem by the Romans Under the Command of Titus, A.D. 70" by David Roberts (1850)

The fast of Tammuz, according to Rabbi Akiva's interpretation, is the fast mentioned in the Book of Zechariah as "the fast of the fourth [month]" (Zechariah 8:19). This refers to Tammuz, which is the fourth month of the Hebrew calendar.

According to the Mishnah, five calamities befell the Jewish people on this day:

1. Moses broke the two tablets of stone on Mount Sinai, when he saw the Golden calf;
2. During the Babylonian siege of Jerusalem the daily tamid offering ceased to be brought because no sheep were available;
3. During the Roman siege of Jerusalem, the city walls were breached, leading to the destruction of the Second Temple on Tisha B'Av;
4. An individual named Apostomus burned a Torah scroll. Jewish sages debated if this event happened prior to Bar Kokhba's revolt (where Apostomus is identified as a Roman military leader), or prior to the Maccabean Revolt (where Apostomus could be another name for Antioch IV).
5. An idol was erected in the Temple, either by king Manasseh of Judah or by Antioch IV.

The Babylonian Talmud places the second and fifth tragedies in the First Temple period.

The Book of Jeremiah (39.2, 52.6–7) states that the walls of Jerusalem during the First Temple were breached on the 9th of Tammuz. Accordingly, the Babylonian Talmud dates the third tragedy (breach of Jerusalem's walls) to the Second Temple period. However, the Jerusalem Talmud (Taanit IV, 5) states that in both eras the walls were breached on 17th Tammuz, and that the text in Jeremiah 39 is explained by stating that the Biblical record was "distorted", apparently due to the troubled times.

The Seventeenth of Tammuz occurs forty days after the Jewish holiday of Shavuot. Moses ascended Mount Sinai on Shavuot and remained there for forty days. The Children of Israel made the Golden Calf on the afternoon of the sixteenth of Tammuz when it seemed that Moses was not coming down when promised. Moses descended the next day (forty days by his count), saw that the Israelites were violating many of the laws he had received from God, and smashed the tablets.

Modern commentators have noted that 17 Tammuz coincided with July 4 upon the origin of that holiday in 1776, and then coincided again in 1863, when that date marked two pivotal victories in the Civil War. . In 1942, 17 Tammuz coincided with July 2, marking the First Battle of El Alamein, in which the British Army scored its first real triumph in North Africa after weeks of retreat, and prevented Nazis from reaching the Holy Land.

== Customs ==
As a minor fast day, fasting lasts from dawn to shortly after dusk. It is customary among Ashkenazi Jews to refrain from listening to music, public entertainment, and haircuts on fast days, and on this occasion because it is also part of The Three Weeks (see below, Bein haMetzarim). Other deprivations applicable to the major fasts (i.e. Yom Kippur and Tisha B'Av) do not apply.

If the 17th of Tammuz falls on a Shabbat, the fast is instead observed the next day, the 18th of Tammuz (on Sunday). This last occurred in 2022, and will occur again in 2029.

A Torah reading, a special prayer in the Amidah (Aneinu), and in many, but not all, Ashkenazic communities Avinu Malkenu are added at the morning Shacharit and afternoon Mincha services. Ashkenazi congregations also read a haftarah (from the Book of Isaiah) at Mincha. Congregations also recite during Shacharit a series of Selichot (special penitential prayers) reflecting the themes of the day.

== Cycle of fasts ==
The 17th of Tammuz is the second of the four fasts commemorating the destruction of the Temple and the Jewish exile in Babylon. It is preceded by the fast of the Tenth of Tevet and arrives three weeks prior to the 25 hour fast of the Ninth of Av. The cycle is also associated historically with the Fast of Gedalia, which is observed on the third day of Tishrei.

== Bein haMetzarim ==
The three weeks beginning with the Seventeenth of Tammuz are known as Bein haMetzarim ("between the straits", i.e. between the days of distress), or The Three Weeks, and serve as an annual period of communal sorrow ending on the fast day of Tisha B'Av — described as "the saddest day in the Jewish calendar" — which is dedicated to remembering and mourning the destruction in Jerusalem of Solomon's Temple in 586 BCE and of the Second Temple in 70 CE. Some customs of mourning, which commemorate the destruction of Jerusalem, are observed from the start of the Three Weeks, particularly for Ashkenazi Jews, while many Sephardic Jews begin the customs on the First of Av.

The oldest extant reference to these days as Bein haMetzarim – which is also the first source for a special status of The Three Weeks – is found in Eikhah Rabbati 1.29 (Lamentations Rabbah, fourth century CE?). This midrash glosses Lamentations 1:3, "All [Zion's] pursuers overtook her between the straits."

The three weeks of mourning between the 17th of Tammuz and 9th of Av is cited as a rabbinically instituted period of fasting for the "especially pious". Such fasting is observed from morning to evening, common with other rabbi-decreed fasts.
