= Metzora =

Metzora may refer to:

- Metzora (parashah), a portion in the annual Jewish cycle of Torah reading
- an individual declared impure with tzaraath
