= Metzora (parashah) =

28th weekly portion in the Jewish cycle of Torah reading

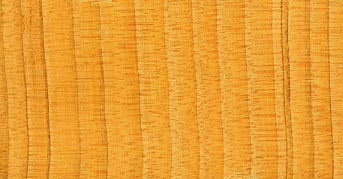
Cedar wood

Metzora, Metzorah, M'tzora, Mezora, Metsora, M'tsora, Metsoro, Meṣora, or Maṣoro (מְצֹרָע—Hebrew for 'one being diseased', the ninth word, and the first distinctive word, in the parashah) is the 28th weekly Torah portion (פָּרָשָׁה, parashah) in the annual Jewish cycle of Torah reading and the fifth in the Book of Leviticus. The parashah deals with ritual impurity. It addresses cleansing from skin disease (צָּרַעַת, tzara'at), houses with an eruptive plague, male genital discharges, and menstruation. The parashah constitutes Leviticus 14:1–15:33. The parashah is made up of 4,697 Hebrew letters, 1,274 Hebrew words, 90 verses, and 159 lines in a Torah Scroll (סֵפֶר תּוֹרָה, Sefer Torah).

Jews generally read it in April or, rarely, in early May. The lunisolar Hebrew calendar contains up to 55 weeks, the exact number varying between 50 in common years and 54 or 55 in leap years. In leap years (for example, 2024 and 2027), Parashat Metzora is read separately. In common years (for example, 2025, 2026, and 2028), Parashat Metzora is combined with the previous parashah, Tazria, to help achieve the needed number of weekly readings.

== Readings ==
In traditional Sabbath Torah reading, the parashah is divided into seven readings, or עליות, aliyot.

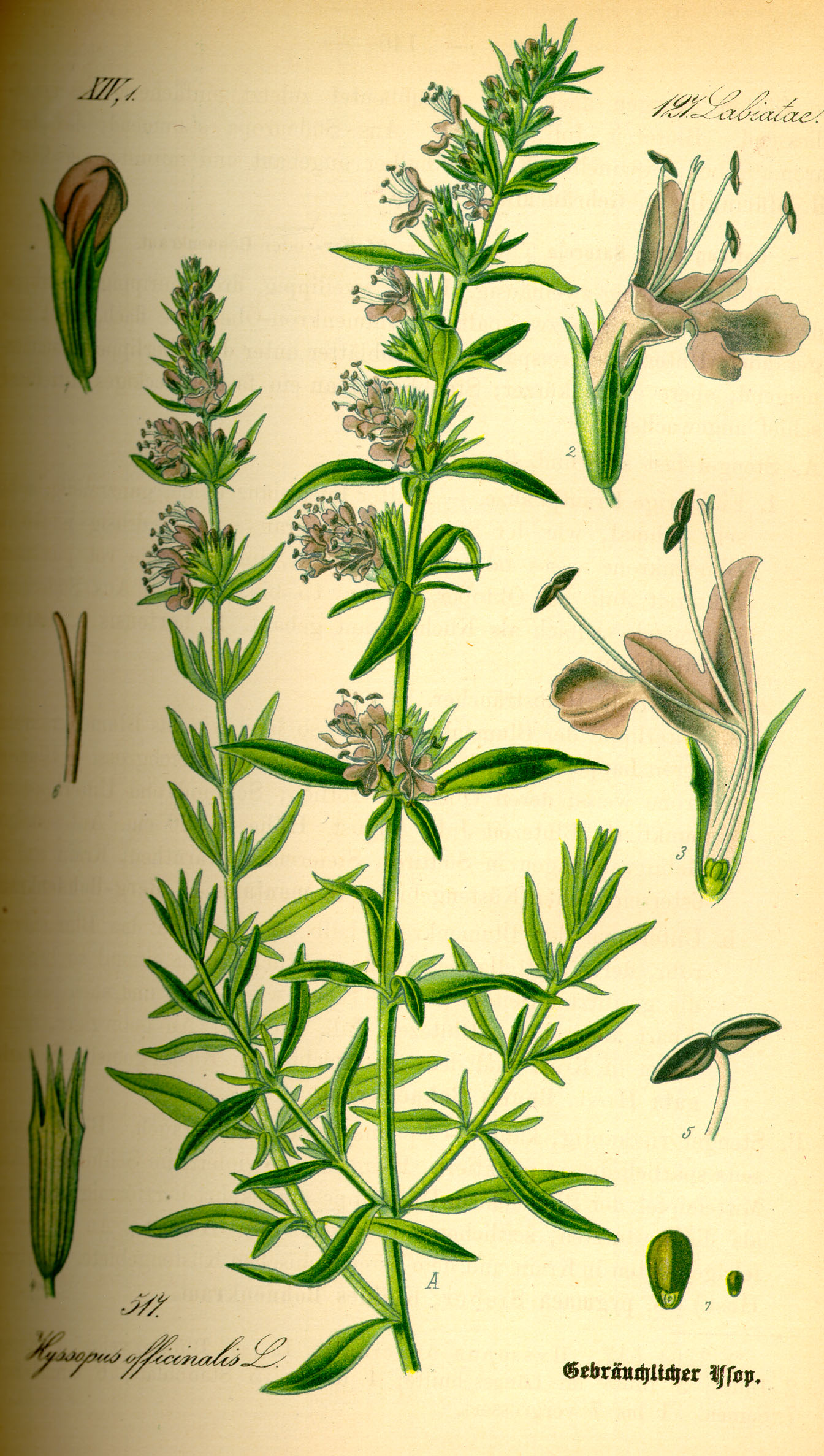
Hyssop (1885 painting by Otto Wilhelm Thomé)

=== First reading—Leviticus 14:1–12 ===
In the first reading, God told Moses the ritual for cleansing one with a skin disease. If the priest saw that the person had healed, the priest would order two live clean birds, cedar wood, crimson stuff, and hyssop. The priest would order one of the birds slaughtered over fresh water and would then dip the live bird, the cedar wood, the crimson stuff, and the hyssop in the blood of the slaughtered bird. The priest would then sprinkle the blood seven times on the one who was to be cleansed and then set the live bird free. The one to be cleansed would then wash his clothes, shave off his hair, bathe in water, and then be clean. On the eighth day after that, the one being cleansed was to present two male lambs, one ewe lamb, choice flour, and oil for the priest to offer.

=== Second reading—Leviticus 14:13–20 ===
In the second reading, the priest was to kill the lamb and put some of its blood and the oil on the ridge of the right ear, the right thumb, and the right big toe of the one being cleansed, and then put more of the oil on his head.

=== Third reading—Leviticus 14:21–32 ===
In the third reading, if the one being cleansed was poor, he could bring two turtle doves or pigeons in place of two of the lambs.

=== Fourth reading—Leviticus 14:33–53 ===
In the fourth reading, God then told Moses and Aaron the ritual for cleansing a house with an eruptive plague. The owner was to tell the priest, who was to order the house cleared and then examine it. If the plague in the walls was greenish or reddish streaks deep into the wall, the priest was to close the house for seven days. If, after seven days, the plague had spread, the priest was to order the stones with the plague to be pulled out and cast outside the city. The house was then to be scraped, the stones replaced, and the house replastered. If the plague again broke out, the house was to be torn down. If the plague did not break out again, the priest was to pronounce the house clean. To purge the house, the priest was to take two birds, cedar wood, crimson stuff, and hyssop, slaughter one bird over fresh water, sprinkle on the house seven times with the bird's blood, and then let the live bird go free.

=== Fifth reading—Leviticus 14:54–15:15 ===
In the fifth reading, God then told Moses and Aaron the ritual for cleansing a person who had a genital discharge. When a man had a discharge from his genitals, he was unclean, and any bedding on which he lay and every object on which he sat was to be unclean. Anyone who touched his body, touched his bedding, touched an object on which he sat, was touched by his spit, or was touched by him before he rinsed his hands was to wash his clothes, bathe in water, and remain unclean until evening. An earthen vessel that he touched was to be broken, and any wooden implement was to be rinsed with water. Seven days after the discharge ended, he was to wash his clothes, bathe his body in fresh water, and be clean. On the eighth day, he was to give two turtle doves or two pigeons to the priest, who was to offer them to make expiation.

=== Sixth reading—Leviticus 15:16–28 ===
In the sixth reading, when a man had an emission of semen, he was to bathe and remain unclean until evening. All material on which semen fell was to be washed in water and remain unclean until evening. And if a man had carnal relations with a woman, they were both to bathe and remain unclean until evening. When a woman had a menstrual discharge, she was to remain impure seven days, and whoever touched her was to be unclean until evening. Anything that she lay on or sat on was unclean. Anyone who touched her bedding or any object on which she has sat was to wash his clothes, bathe in water, and remain unclean until evening. And if a man lay with her, her impurity was communicated to him and he was to be unclean seven days, and any bedding on which he lay became unclean. When a woman had an irregular discharge of blood, she was to be unclean as long as her discharge lasted. Seven days after the discharge ended, she was to be clean.

=== Seventh reading—Leviticus 15:29–33 ===
In the seventh reading, on the eighth day, the woman was to give two turtle doves or two pigeons to the priest, who was to offer them to make expiation. God told Moses and Aaron to put the Israelites on guard against uncleanness, lest they die by defiling God's Tabernacle.

=== Readings according to the triennial cycle ===
Jews who read the Torah according to the triennial cycle of Torah reading may read the parashah according to a different schedule.

== In inner-biblical interpretation ==
The parashah has parallels or is discussed in these Biblical sources:

=== Leviticus chapter 14 ===
Leviticus 13–14 associates skin disease with uncleanness, and Leviticus 15 associates various sexuality-related events with uncleanness. In the Hebrew Bible, uncleanness has a variety of associations. Leviticus 11:8, 11; 21:1–4, 11; and Numbers 6:6–7; and 19:11–16; associate it with death. And perhaps similarly, Leviticus 12 associates it with childbirth and Leviticus 13–14 associates it with skin disease. Leviticus 15 associates it with various sexuality-related events. And Jeremiah 2:7, 23; 3:2; and 7:30; and Hosea 6:10 associate it with contact with the worship of alien gods.

The Hebrew Bible reports skin disease (צָּרַעַת, tzara'at) and a person affected by skin disease (מְּצֹרָע, metzora) at several places, often (and sometimes incorrectly) translated as "leprosy" and "a leper." In Exodus 4:6, to help Moses to convince others that God had sent him, God instructed Moses to put his hand into his bosom, and when he took it out, his hand was "leprous (מְצֹרַעַת, m'tzora'at), as white as snow." In Leviticus 13–14, the Torah sets out regulations for skin diseases (צָּרַעַת, tzara'at) and a person affected by skin disease (מְּצֹרָע, metzora). In Numbers 12:10, after Miriam spoke against Moses, God's cloud removed from the Tent of Meeting and "Miriam was leprous (מְצֹרַעַת, m'tzora'at), as white as snow." In Deuteronomy 24:8–9, Moses warned the Israelites in the case of skin disease (צָּרַעַת, tzara'at) diligently to observe all that the priests would teach them, remembering what God did to Miriam. In 2 Kings 5:1–19, part of the haftarah for Parashat Tazria, the prophet Elisha cures Naaman, the commander of the army of the king of Aram, who was a "leper" (מְּצֹרָע, metzora). In 2 Kings 7:3–20, part of the haftarah for Parashat Metzora, the story is told of four "leprous men" (מְצֹרָעִים, m'tzora'im) at the gate during the Arameans' siege of Samaria. And in 2 Chronicles 26:19, after King Uzziah tried to burn incense in the Temple in Jerusalem, "leprosy (צָּרַעַת, tzara'at) broke forth on his forehead."

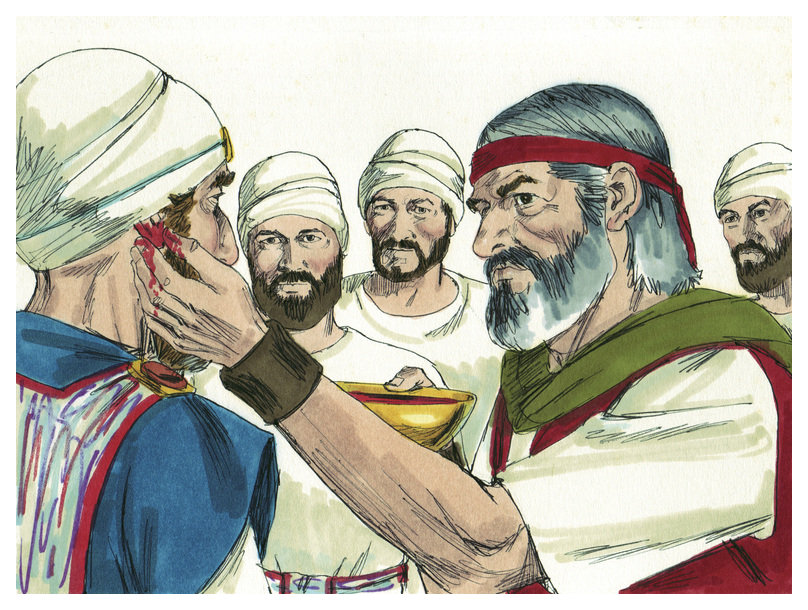
Illustration from a 1984 Bible story book, showing Moses putting blood on Aaron's right ear

The Torah mentions the combination of ear, thumb, and toe in three places. In Exodus 29:20, God instructed Moses how to initiate the priests, telling him to kill a ram, take some of its blood, and put it on the tip of the right ear of Aaron and his sons, on the thumb of their right hand, and on the great toe of their right foot, and dash the remaining blood against the altar round about. And then Leviticus 8:23–24 reports that Moses followed God's instructions to initiate Aaron and his sons. Then, Leviticus 14:14, 17, 25, and 28 set forth a similar procedure for the cleansing of a person with skin disease (צָּרַעַת, tzara'at). In Leviticus 14:14, God instructed the priest on the day of the person's cleansing to take some of the blood of a guilt-offering and put it upon the tip of the right ear, the thumb of the right hand, and the great toe of the right foot of the one to be cleansed. And then in Leviticus 14:17, God instructed the priest to put oil on the tip of the right ear, the thumb of the right hand, and the great toe of the right foot of the one to be cleansed, on top of the blood of the guilt-offering. And finally, in Leviticus 14:25 and 28, God instructed the priest to repeat the procedure on the eighth day to complete the person's cleansing.

== In early nonrabbinic interpretation ==
The parashah has parallels or is discussed in these early nonrabbinic sources:

=== Leviticus chapter 14 ===
Philo taught that the skin disease in Leviticus 14 signified voluntary depravity.

== In classical rabbinic interpretation ==
The parashah is discussed in these rabbinic sources from the era of the Mishnah and the Talmud:

=== Leviticus chapter 14 ===
Tractate Negaim in the Mishnah and Tosefta interpreted the laws of skin disease in Leviticus 14.

Leviticus 18:4 calls on the Israelites to obey God's "statutes" (חֻקִּים, chukim) and "ordinances" (מִשְׁפָּטִים, mishpatim). The Rabbis in a Baraita taught that the "ordinances" (מִשְׁפָּטִים, mishpatim) were commandments that logic would have dictated that we follow even had Scripture not commanded them, like the laws concerning idolatry, adultery, bloodshed, robbery, and blasphemy. And "statutes" (חֻקִּים, chukim) were commandments that the Adversary challenges us to violate as beyond reason, like those relating to purification of the person with skin disease (צָּרַעַת, tzara'at, in Leviticus 14), wool-linen mixtures (שַׁעַטְנֵז, shaatnez, in Leviticus 19:19 and Deuteronomy 22:11), release from levirate marriage (חליצה, chalitzah, in Deuteronomy 25:5–10), and the he goat for Azazel (in Leviticus 16). So that people do not think these "ordinances" (מִשְׁפָּטִים, mishpatim) to be empty acts, in Leviticus 18:4, God says, "I am the Lord," indicating that the Lord made these statutes, and we have no right to question them.

The Midrash said that many things appear lowly, but God commanded many precepts to be performed with them. The hyssop, for instance, appears to be of no worth to people, yet its power is great in the eyes of God, who put it on a level with cedar in the purification of the leper in Leviticus 14:4–6 and the burning of the Red Cow in Numbers 19:6, 18, and employed it in the Exodus from Egypt in Exodus 12:22.

Rabbi Johanan said in the name of Rabbi Joseph ben Zimra that anyone who bears evil tales (לשון הרע, lashon hara) will be visited by the plague of skin disease (צָּרַעַת, tzara’at), as it is said in Psalm 101:5: "Whoever slanders his neighbor in secret, him will I destroy (azmit)." The Gemara read azmit to allude to צָּרַעַת, tzara’at, and cited how Leviticus 25:23 says "in perpetuity" (la-zemitut). And Resh Lakish interpreted the words of Leviticus 14:2, "This shall be the law of the person with skin disease (metzora)," to mean, "This shall be the law for him who brings up an evil name (motzi shem ra)." And the Gemara reported that in the Land of Israel they taught that slander kills three persons: the slanderer, the one who accepts it, and the one about whom the slander is told.

Similarly, Rabbi Haninah taught that skin disease came only from slander. The Rabbis found a proof for this from the case of Miriam, arguing that because she uttered slander against Moses, plagues attacked her. And the Rabbis read Deuteronomy 24:8–9 to support this when it says in connection with skin disease, "remember what the Lord your God did to Miriam."

Rabbi Samuel bar Nahmani said in the name of Rabbi Johanan that skin disease results from seven things: slander, the shedding of blood, vain oath, incest, arrogance, robbery, and envy. The Gemara cited scriptural bases for each of the associations: For slander, Psalm 101:5; for bloodshed, 2 Samuel 3:29; for a vain oath, 2 Kings 5:23–27; for incest, Genesis 12:17; for arrogance, 2 Chronicles 26:16–19; for robbery, Leviticus 14:36 (as a Tanna taught that those who collect money that does not belong to them will see a priest come and scatter their money around the street); and for envy, Leviticus 14:35.

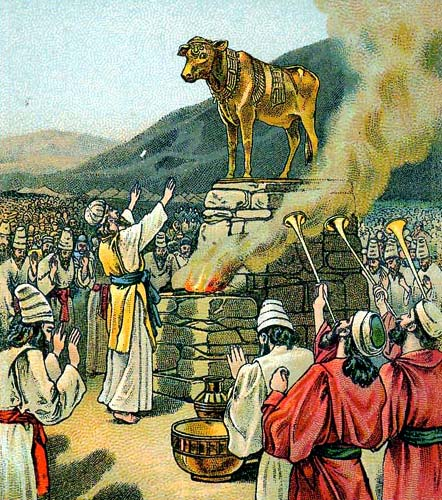
Worshiping the golden calf (illustration from a 1901 Bible card published by the Providence Lithograph Company)

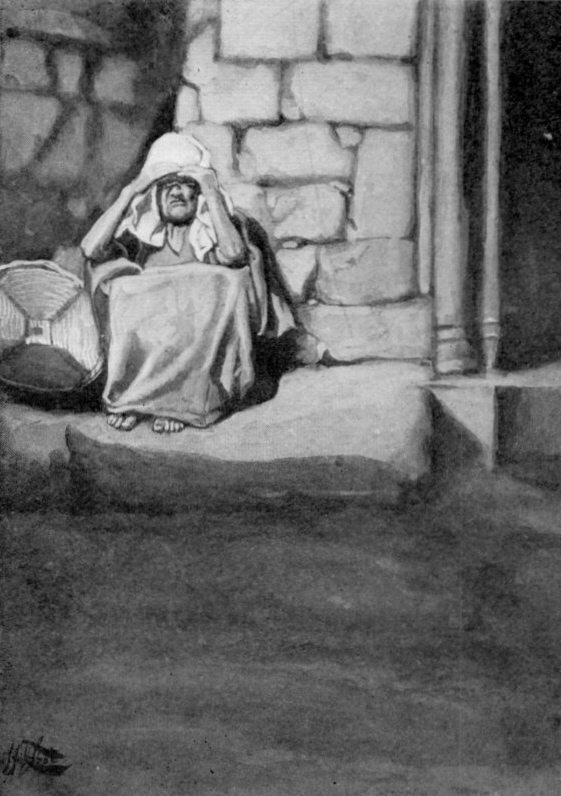
Miriam Shut Out from the Camp (watercolor circa 1896–1902 by James Tissot)

Similarly, a Midrash taught that skin disease resulted from 10 sins: (1) idol-worship, (2) unchastity, (3) bloodshed, (4) the profanation of the Divine Name, (5) blasphemy of the Divine Name, (6) robbing the public, (7) usurping a dignity to which one has no right, (8) overweening pride, (9) evil speech, and (10) an evil eye. The Midrash cited as proofs: (1) for idol-worship, the experience of the Israelites who said of the Golden Calf, "This is your god, O Israel," in Exodus 32:4 and then were smitten with leprosy, as reported in Exodus 32:25, where "Moses saw that the people had broken out (parua, פָרֻעַ)," indicating that leprosy had "broken out" (parah) among them; (2) for unchastity, from the experience of the daughters of Zion of whom Isaiah 3:16 says, "the daughters of Zion are haughty, and walk with stretched-forth necks and ogling eyes," and then Isaiah 3:17 says, "Therefore will the Lord smite with a scab the crown of the head of the daughters of Zion"; (3) for bloodshed, from the experience of Joab, of whom 2 Samuel 3:29 says, "Let it fall upon the head of Joab, and upon all his father's house; and let there not fail from the house of Joab one that hath an issue, or that is a leper," (4) for the profanation of the Divine Name, from the experience of Gehazi, of whom 2 Kings 5:20 says, "But Gehazi, the servant of Elisha the man of God, said: ‘Behold, my master has spared this Naaman the Aramean, in not receiving at his hands that which he brought; as the Lord lives, I will surely run after him, and take of him somewhat (me'umah, מְאוּמָה)," and "somewhat" (me'umah, מְאוּמָה) means "of the blemish" (mum, מוּם) that Naaman had, and thus Gehazi was smitten with leprosy, as 2 Kings 5:20 reports Elisha said to Gehazi, "The leprosy therefore of Naaman shall cleave to you"; (5) for blaspheming the Divine Name, from the experience of Goliath, of whom 1 Samuel 17:43 says, "And the Philistine cursed David by his God," and the 1 Samuel 17:46 says, "This day will the Lord deliver (sagar, סַגֶּרְ) you," and the term "deliver" (סַגֶּרְ, sagar) is used here in the same sense as Leviticus 13:5 uses it with regard to leprosy, when it is says, "And the priest shall shut him up (סַגֶּרְ, sagar)"; (6) for robbing the public, from the experience of Shebna, who derived illicit personal benefit from property of the Sanctuary, and of whom Isaiah 22:17 says, "the Lord . . . will wrap you round and round," and "wrap" must refer to a leper, of whom Leviticus 13:45 says, "And he shall wrap himself over the upper lip"; (7) for usurping a dignity to which one has no right, from the experience of Uzziah, of whom 2 Chronicles 26:21 says, "And Uzziah the king was a leper to the day of his death"; (8) for overweening pride, from the same example of Uzziah, of whom 2 Chronicles 26:16 says, "But when he became strong, his heart was lifted up, so that he did corruptly and he trespassed against the Lord his God"; (9) for evil speech, from the experience of Miriam, of whom Numbers 12:1 says, "And Miriam . . . spoke against Moses," and then Numbers 12:10 says, "when the cloud was removed from over the Tent, behold Miriam was leprous"; and (10) for an evil eye, from the person described in Leviticus 14:35, which can be read, "And he that keeps his house to himself shall come to the priest, saying: There seems to me to be a plague in the house," and Leviticus 14:35 thus describes one who is not willing to permit any other to have any benefit from the house.

Similarly, Rabbi Judah the Levite, son of Rabbi Shalom, inferred that skin disease comes because of eleven sins: (1) for cursing the Divine Name, (2) for immorality, (3) for bloodshed, (4) for ascribing to another a fault that is not in him, (5) for haughtiness, (6) for encroaching upon other people's domains, (7) for a lying tongue, (8) for theft, (9) for swearing falsely, (10) for profanation of the name of Heaven, and (11) for idolatry. Rabbi Isaac added: for ill-will. And our Rabbis said: for despising the words of the Torah.

It was taught in a Baraita that four types of people are accounted as though they were dead: a poor person, a person affected by skin disease (מְּצֹרָע, metzora), a blind person, and one who is childless. A poor person is accounted as dead, for Exodus 4:19 says, "for all the men are dead who sought your life" (and the Gemara interpreted this to mean that they had been stricken with poverty). A person affected by skin disease (מְּצֹרָע, metzora) is accounted as dead, for Numbers 12:10–12 says, "And Aaron looked upon Miriam, and behold, she was leprous (מְצֹרָעַת, metzora'at). And Aaron said to Moses . . . let her not be as one dead." The blind are accounted as dead, for Lamentations 3:6 says, "He has set me in dark places, as they that be dead of old." And one who is childless is accounted as dead, for in Genesis 30:1, Rachel said, "Give me children, or else I am dead."

A Midrash taught that Divine Justice first attacks a person's substance and then the person's body. So when leprous plagues come upon a person, first they come upon the fabric of the person's house. If the person repents, then Leviticus 14:40 requires that only the affected stones need to be pulled out; if the person does not repent, then Leviticus 14:45 requires pulling down the house. Then the plagues come upon the person's clothes. If the person repents, then the clothes require washing; if not, they require burning. Then the plagues come upon the person's body. If the person repents, Leviticus 14:1–32 provides for purification; if not, then Leviticus 13:46 ordains that the person "shall dwell alone."

Similarly, the Tosefta reported that when a person would come to the priest, the priest would tell the person to engage in self-examination and turn from evil ways. The priest would continue that plagues come only from gossip, and skin disease from arrogance. But God would judge in mercy. The plague would come to the house, and if the homeowner repented, the house required only dismantling, but if the homeowner did not repent, the house required demolition. They would appear on clothing, and if the owner repented, the clothing required only tearing, but if the owner did not repent, the clothing required burning. They would appear on the person's body, and if the person repented, well and good, but if the person did not repent, Leviticus 13:46 required that the person "shall dwell alone."

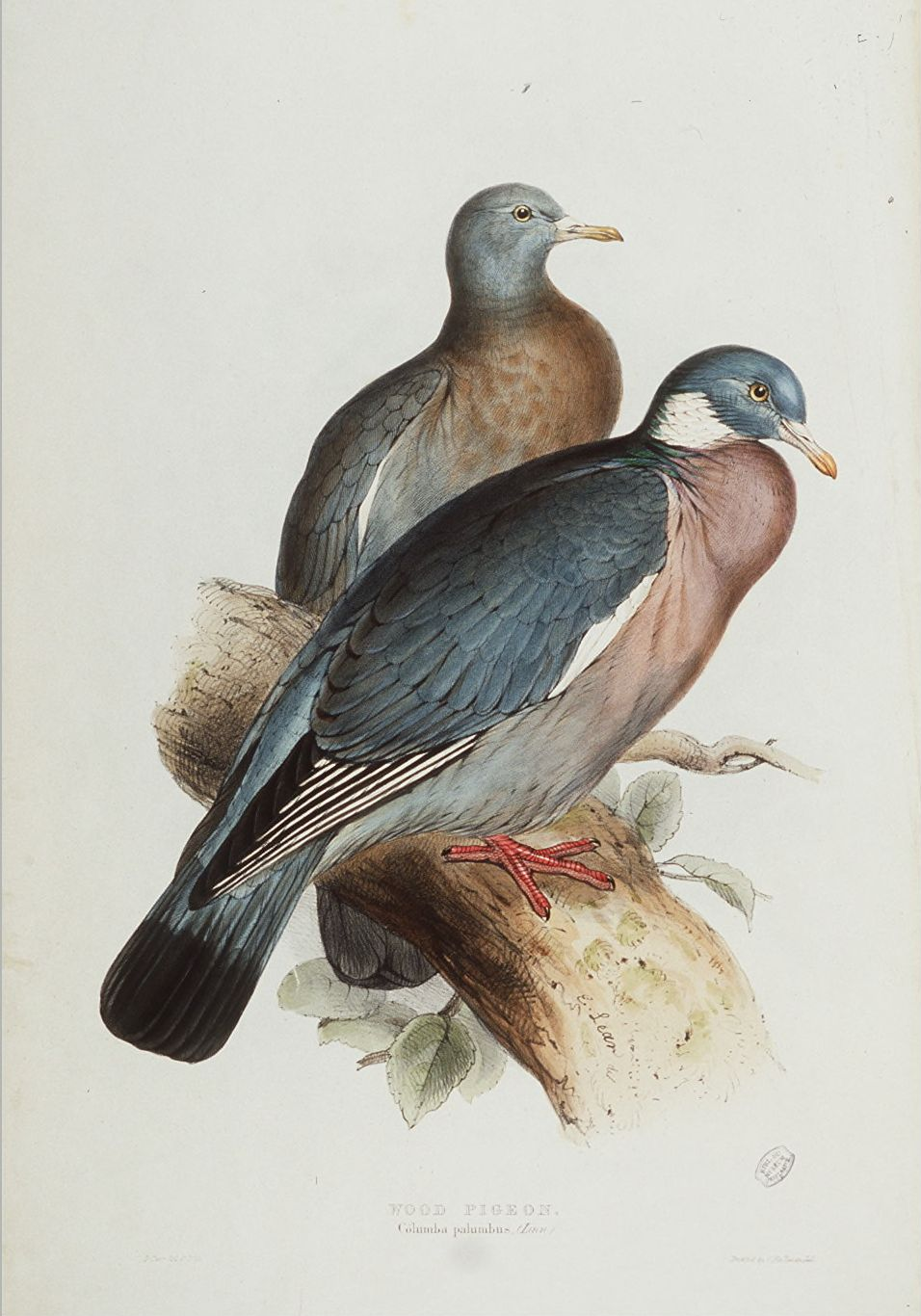
Pigeons (painting circa 1832–1837 by John Gould)

In the priest's examination of skin disease mandated by Leviticus 13:2, 9, and 14:2, the Mishnah taught that a priest could examine anyone else's symptoms, but not his own. And Rabbi Meir taught that the priest could not examine his relatives. The Mishnah taught that anyone could inspect skin disease, but only a priest could declare it unclean or clean. The Mishnah taught that the priests delayed examining a bridegroom—as well as his house and his garment—until after his seven days of rejoicing, and delayed examining anyone until after a holy day.

Rabbi Joshua ben Levi taught that Leviticus 14:4 required "two living clean birds" to be brought to purify the person afflicted with skin disease because the afflicted person did the work of a babbler in spreading evil tales, and therefore Leviticus 14:4 required that the afflicted person offer babbling birds as a sacrifice.

The Gemara interpreted the expression "two living birds" in Leviticus 14:4. The Gemara interpreted the word "living" to mean those whose principal limbs are living (excluding birds that are missing a limb) and to exclude treifah birds (birds with an injury or defect that would prevent them from living out a year). The Gemara interpreted the word "birds" (צִפֳּרִים, zipparim) to mean kosher birds. The Gemara deduced from the words of Deuteronomy 14:11, "Every bird (צִפּוֹר, zippor) that is clean you may eat," that some zipparim are forbidden as unclean—namely, birds slaughtered pursuant to Leviticus 14. The Gemara interpreted the words of Deuteronomy 14:12, "And these are they of which you shall not eat," to refer to birds slaughtered pursuant to Leviticus 14. And the Gemara taught that Deuteronomy 14:11–12 repeats the commandment so as to teach that one who consumes a bird slaughtered pursuant to Leviticus 14 infringes both a positive and a negative commandment.

Rabbi Isaac taught that God told Noah that just as a pair of birds (ken) cleansed a person with skin disease (as instructed in Leviticus 14:4–8), so Noah's Ark would cleanse Noah (so that he would be worthy to be saved from the Flood).

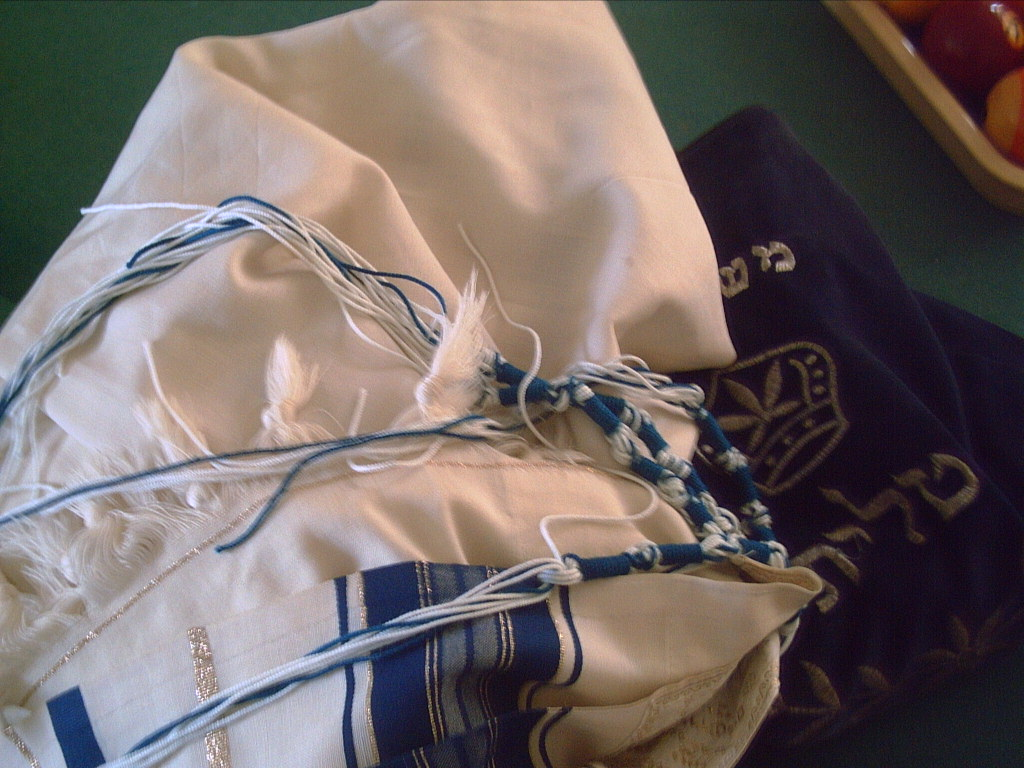
Blue techelet thread on a set of tzitzit

Rabbi Hanina ben Gamaliel interpreted the words "completely blue (תְּכֵלֶת, techelet)" in Exodus 28:31 to teach that blue dye used to test the dye is unfit for further use to dye the blue, techelet strand of a tzitzit, interpreting the word "completely" to mean "full strength." But Rabbi Johanan ben Dahabai taught that even the second dyeing using the same dye is valid, reading the words "and scarlet" (וּשְׁנִי תוֹלַעַת, ushni tolalat) in Leviticus 14:4 to mean "a second [dying] of red wool."

A Midrash says that God commanded the Israelites to perform certain precepts with similar material from trees: God commanded that the Israelites throw cedar wood and hyssop into the Red Heifer mixture of Numbers 19:6 and use hyssop to sprinkle the resulting waters of lustration in Numbers 19:18; God commanded that the Israelites use cedar wood and hyssop to purify those stricken with skin disease in Leviticus 14:4–6; and in Egypt God commanded the Israelites to use the bunch of hyssop to strike the lintel and the two side-posts with blood in Exodus 12:22.

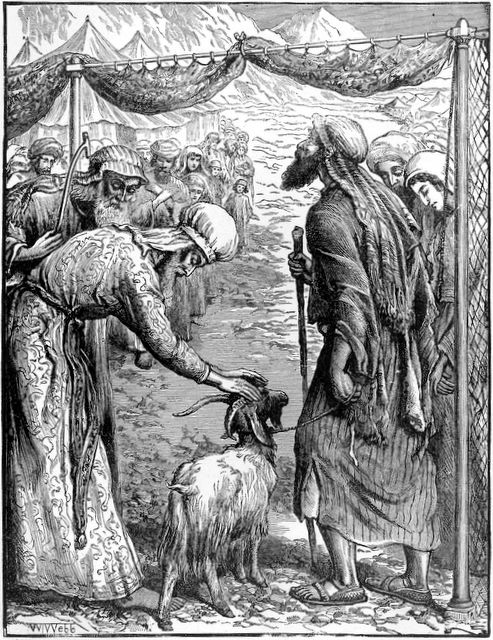
Sending Out the goat for Azazel on Yom Kippur (illustration by William James Webb)

A Midrash interpreted the words, "And he spoke of trees, from the cedar that is in Lebanon even to the hyssop that springs out of the wall," in 1 Kings 5:13 to teach that Solomon interpreted the requirement in Leviticus 14:4–6 to use cedar wood and hyssop to purify those stricken with skin disease. Solomon asked why the person stricken with skin disease was purified by means of the tallest and lowest of trees. And Solomon answered that the person's raising himself up like a cedar caused him to be smitten with skin disease, but making himself small and humbling himself like the hyssop caused him be healed.

When Rav Dimi came from the Land of Israel, he said in the name of Rabbi Johanan that there were three red threads: one in connection with the red cow in Numbers 19:6, the second in connection with the "scapegoat for Azazel" in the Yom Kippur service of Leviticus 16:7–10 (which Mishnah Yoma 4:2 indicates was marked with a red thread), and the third in connection with the person with skin disease (מְּצֹרָע, metzora) in Leviticus 14:4. Rav Dimi reported that one weighed ten zuz, another weighed two selas, and the third weighed a shekel, but he could not say which was which. When Rabin came, he said in the name of Rabbi Jonathan that the thread in connection with the red cow weighed ten zuz, that of the goat for Azazel weighed two selas, and that of the person with skin disease weighed a shekel. Rabbi Johanan said that Rabbi Simeon ben Halafta and the Sages disagreed about the thread of the red cow, one saying that it weighed ten shekels, the other that it weighed one shekel. Rabbi Jeremiah of Difti said to Rabina that they disagreed not about the thread of the red cow, but about that of the goat for Azazel.

The Gemara taught that there were three who were required to cut their hair, and whose hair cutting was a religious duty: nazirites (as stated in Numbers 6:18), those afflicted with skin disease (מְּצֹרָע, metzora, as stated in Leviticus 14:9), and the Levites. Citing the Mishnah, the Gemara taught that if any of them cut their hair without a razor, or left behind two hairs, their act was invalid.

A Master said in a Baraita that the use of the thumb for service in Leviticus 8:23–24 and 14:14, 17, 25, and 28 showed that every finger has its own unique purpose.

Leviticus 5:7; 5:11; 12:8; and 14:21–22 provided that people of lesser means could bring less-expensive offerings. The Mishnah taught that one who sacrificed much and one who sacrificed little attained equal merit, so long as they directed their hearts to Heaven. Rabbi Zera taught that Ecclesiastes 5:11 provided a Scriptural proof for this when it says, "Sweet is the sleep of a serving man, whether he eat little or much." Rav Adda bar Ahavah taught that Ecclesiastes 5:10 provided a Scriptural proof for this when it says, "When goods increase, they are increased who eat them; and what advantage is there to the owner thereof." Rabbi Simeon ben Azzai taught that Scripture says of a large ox, "An offering made by fire of a sweet savor"; of a small bird, "An offering made by fire of a sweet savor"; and of a meal-offering, "An offering made by fire of a sweet savor." Rabbi Simeon ben Azzai thus taught that Scripture uses the same expression each time to teach that it is the same whether people offered much or little, so long as they directed their hearts to Heaven. And Rabbi Isaac asked why the meal-offering was distinguished in that Leviticus 2:1 uses the word "soul" (נֶפֶשׁ, nefesh) to refer to the donor of a meal-offering, instead of the usual "man" (אָדָם, adam, in Leviticus 1:2, or אִישׁ, ish, in Leviticus 7:8) used in connection with other sacrifices. Rabbi Isaac taught that Leviticus 2:1 uses the word "soul" (נֶפֶשׁ, nefesh) because God said that the one who usually brought a meal-offering was a poor man, and God accounted it as if the poor man had offered his own soul.

The Sifra said that Leviticus 14:21 says both, "if he be poor," and "his means do not suffice." The Sifra explained that reading "if he be poor," one might think that the verse allowed a less expensive offering for one who was relatively poorer that earlier, as in the case of one who earlier had 100 manehs and now had 50 manehs. Thus Leviticus 14:21 also says, "his means do not suffice" (as an absolute matter).

Tractate Kinnim in the Mishnah interpreted the laws of pairs of sacrificial pigeons and doves in Leviticus 1:14, 5:7, 12:6–8, 14:22, and 15:29; and Numbers 6:10.

The Mishnah taught that they buried the bird offerings of the metzora.

In a Baraita, Rabbi Jose related that a certain Elder from Jerusalem told him that 24 types of patients are afflicted with boils. The Gemara then related that Rabbi Joḥanan warned to be careful of the flies found on those afflicted with the disease ra’atan, as flies carried the disease. Rabbi Zeira would not sit in a spot where the wind blew from the direction of someone afflicted with ra’atan. Rabbi Elazar would not enter the tent of one afflicted with ra’atan, and Rabbi Ami and Rabbi Asi would not eat eggs from an alley in which someone afflicted with ra’atan lived. Rabbi Joshua ben Levi, however, would attach himself to those afflicted with ra’atan and study Torah, saying this was justified by Proverbs 5:19, “The Torah is a loving hind and a graceful doe." Rabbi Joshua reasoned that if Torah bestows grace on those who learn it, it could protect them from illness. When Rabbi Joshua ben Levi was on the verge of dying, the Gemara told, the Angel of Death was instructed to perform Rabbi Joshua's bidding, as he was a righteous man and deserves to die in the manner he saw fit. Rabbi Joshua ben Levi asked the Angel of Death to show him his place in paradise, and the Angel agreed. Rabbi Joshua ben Levi asked the Angel to give him the knife that the Angel used to kill people, lest the Angel frighten him on the way, and the Angel gave it to him. When they arrived in paradise, the Angel lifted Rabbi Joshua so that he could see his place in paradise, and Rabbi Joshua jumped to the other side, escaping into paradise. Elijah the Prophet then told those in paradise to make way for Rabbi Joshua.

The Gemara told that Rabbi Joshua ben Levi asked Elijah when the Messiah would come, and Elijah told Rabbi Joshua ben Levi that he could find the Messiah sitting at the entrance of the city of Rome among the poor who suffer from illnesses.

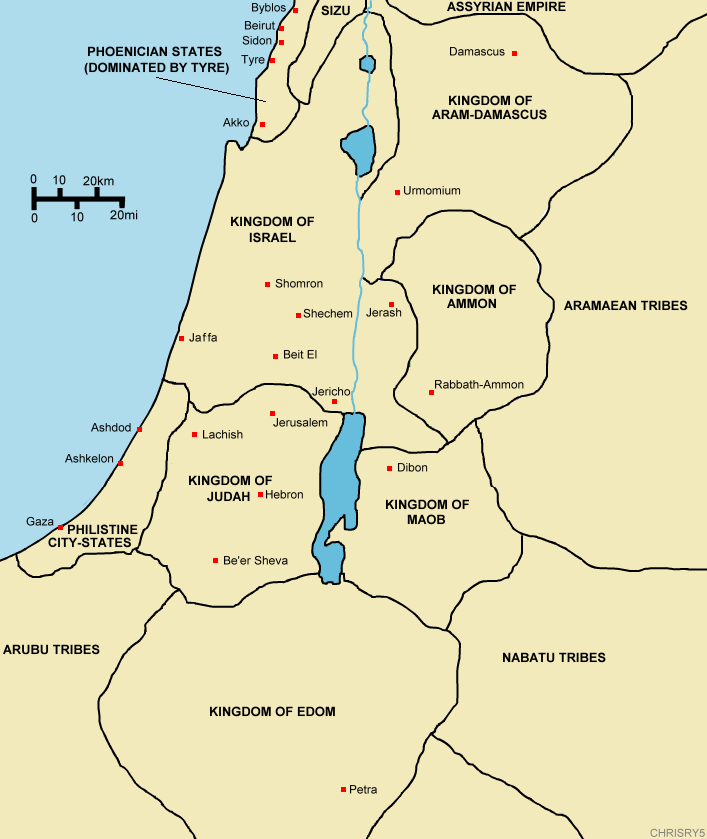
The Levant in the 9th Century B.C.E.

In Leviticus 14:33–34, God announced that God would "put the plague of leprosy in a house of the land of your possession." Rabbi Hiyya asked: Was it then a piece of good news that plagues were to come upon them? Rabbi Simeon ben Yohai answered that when the Canaanites heard that the Israelites were approaching, they hid their valuables in their houses. But God promised the Israelites' forebears that God would bring the Israelites into a land full of good things, including (in the words of Deuteronomy 6:11) "houses full of all good things." So God brought plagues upon a house of one of the Israelites so that when he would pull it down, he would find a treasure.

Reading Leviticus 14:33 and 15:1, a Midrash taught that in 18 verses, Scripture places Moses and Aaron (the instruments of Israel's deliverance) on an equal footing (reporting that God spoke to both of them alike), and thus there are 18 benedictions in the Amidah.

The Sifra read the words "the land of Canaan" in Leviticus 14:34 to refer to the Land that God set aside distinctly for the Israelites. The Sifra thus read the words "which I give to you" in Leviticus 14:34 to exclude the lands of Ammon and Moab east of the Jordan River. Thus house plagues could occur only in the Land of Israel west of the Jordan. And Rabbi Ishmael read the words "of your possession" in Leviticus 14:34 to exclude the possession of Gentiles in the Land of Israel from house plagues.

Because Leviticus 14:34 addresses "a house of the land," the Mishnah taught that a house built on a ship, on a raft, or on four beams could not be afflicted by a house plague.

A Midrash said the difference in wording between Genesis 47:27, which says of the Israelites in Goshen that "they got possessions therein," and Leviticus 14:34, which says of the Israelites in Canaan, "When you come into the land of Canaan, which I gave you for a possession." The Midrash read Genesis 47:27 to read, "and they were taken in possession by it." The Midrash thus taught that in the case of Goshen, the land seized the Israelites, so that their bond might be exacted and so as to bring about God's declaration to Abraham in Genesis 15:13 that the Egyptians would afflict the Israelites for 400 years. But the Midrash read Leviticus 14:34 to teach the Israelites that if they were worthy, the Land of Israel would be an eternal possession, but if not, they would be banished from it.

The Rabbis taught that a structure of less than four square cubits could not contract a house plague. The Gemara explained that in speaking of house plagues, Leviticus 14:35 uses the word "house," and a building of less than four square cubits did not constitute a "house."

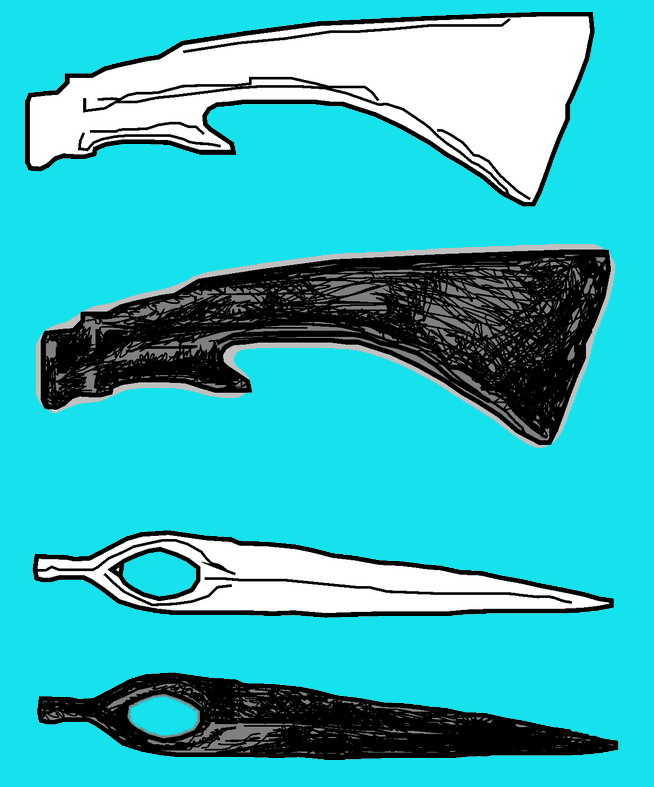
Bronze ax heads of the type used between 1500 B.C.E. and 500 B.C.E. in the region of the Adriatic Sea (2008 drawing by Bratislav Tabaš)

A Baraita (which the Gemara later said may have reflected the view of Rabbi Meir, or may have reflected the view of the Rabbis) taught that a synagogue, a house owned by partners, and a house owned by a woman are all subject to uncleanness from house plagues. The Gemara explained that the Baraita needed to expound this because one might have argued that Leviticus 14:35 says, "then he who owns the house shall come and tell the priest," and "he who owns the house" could be read to imply "he" but not "she" and "he" but not "they." And therefore the Baraita teaches that one should not read Leviticus 14:35 that narrowly. And the Gemara explained that one should not read Leviticus 14:35 that narrowly because Leviticus 14:34 speaks broadly of "a house of the land of your possession," indicating that all houses in the Land of Israel are susceptible to plagues. The Gemara then asked why Leviticus 14:35 bothers to say, "he who owns the house." The Gemara explained that Leviticus 14:35 intends to teach that if a homeowner keeps his house to himself exclusively, refusing to lend his belongings, pretending that he did not own them, then God exposes the homeowner by subjecting his house to the plague and causing his belongings to be removed for all to see (as Leviticus 14:36 requires). Thus Leviticus 14:35 excludes from the infliction of house plagues homeowners who lend their belongings to others.

Similarly, Rabbi Isaac taught that when a person asked to borrow a friend's ax or sieve, and the friend out of selfishness replied that he did not have one, then immediately the plague would attack the friend's house. And as Leviticus 14:36 required that they remove everything that he had in his house, including his axes and his sieves, the people would see his possessions and exclaim how selfish he had been.

But the Gemara asked whether a synagogue could be subject to house plagues. For a Baraita (which the Gemara later identified with the view of the Rabbis) taught that one might assume that synagogues and houses of learning are subject to house plagues, and therefore Leviticus 14:35 says, "he who has the house will come," to exclude those houses—like synagogues—that do not belong to any one individual. The Gemara proposed a resolution to the conflict by explaining that the first Baraita reflected the opinion of Rabbi Meir, while the second Baraita reflected the opinion of the Rabbis. For a Baraita taught that a synagogue that contains a dwelling for the synagogue attendant is required to have a mezuzah, but a synagogue that contains no dwelling, Rabbi Meir declares it is required to have a mezuzah, but the Sages exempt it.

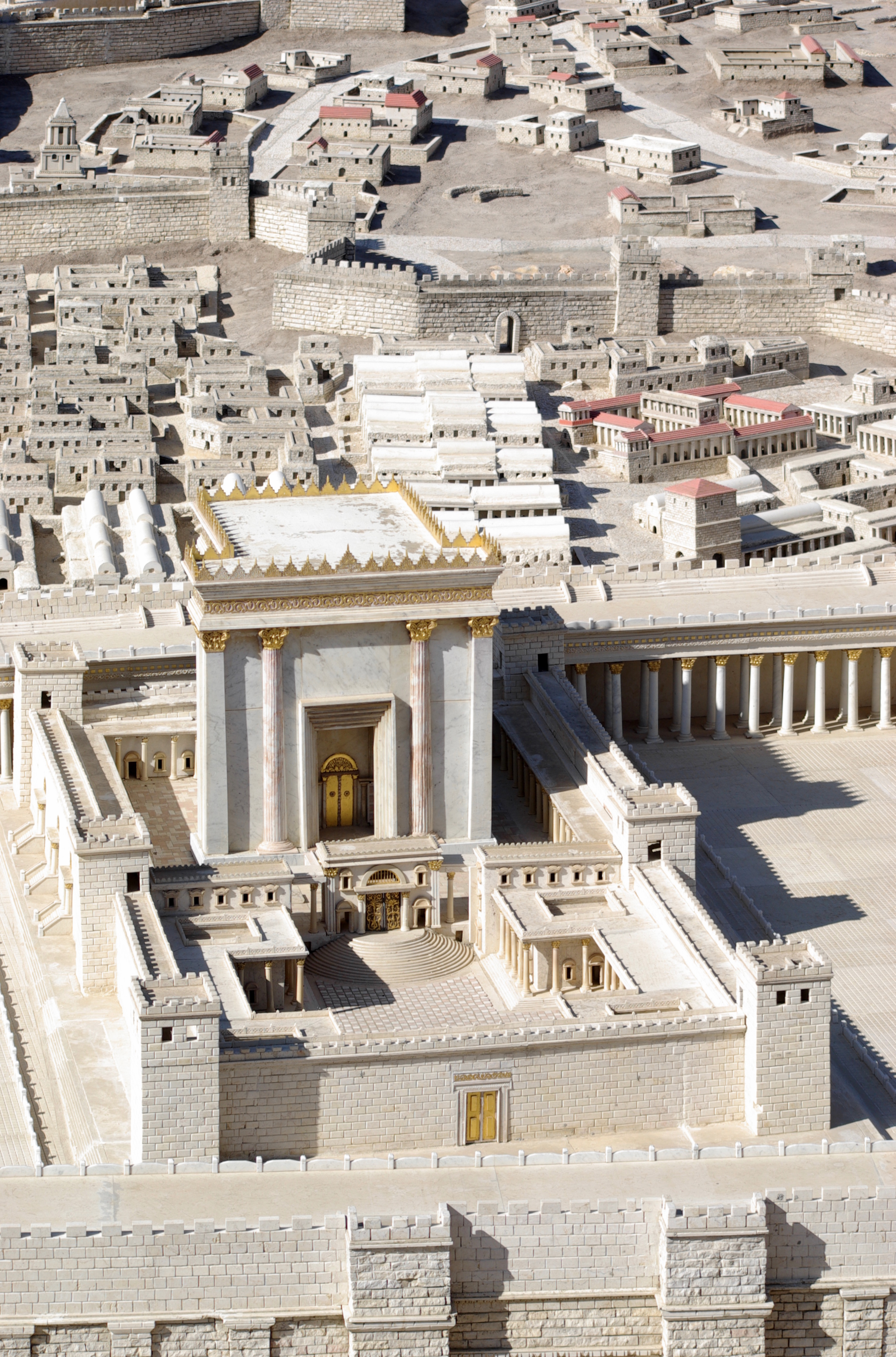
The Second Temple in Jerusalem (model in the Israel Museum)

Alternatively, the Gemara suggested that both teachings were in accord with the Rabbis. In the first case, the synagogue referred to has a dwelling, and then even the Rabbis would say that it would be subject to house plagues. In the other case, the synagogue referred to has no dwelling, and so would not be subject to house plagues.

Alternatively, the Gemara tentatively suggested that in both cases, the synagogue has no dwelling, but the first teaching refers to urban synagogues, while the second refers to rural synagogues. But the Gemara asked whether urban synagogues really are not subject to uncleanness from house plagues. For a Baraita taught that the words, "in the house of the land of your possession" in Leviticus 14:34 teach that a house of the land of the Israelites' possession could become defiled through house plagues, but Jerusalem could not become defiled through house plagues, because Jerusalem did not fall within any single Tribe's inheritance. Rabbi Judah, however, said that he had heard that only the Temple in Jerusalem was unaffected by house plagues. Thus, Rabbi Judah's view would imply that synagogues and houses of learning are subject to house plagues even in large cities. The Gemara suggested, however, that one should read Rabbi Judah's view to say that sacred places are not subject to house plagues. The Gemara suggested that the principle that the first Tanna and Rabbi Judah were disputing was whether Jerusalem was divided among the Tribes; the first Tanna holds that Jerusalem was not divided, while Rabbi Judah holds that Jerusalem was divided among the Tribes.

But the Gemara asked whether even rural synagogues could be subject to house plagues. For a Baraita taught that the words, "in the house of the land of your possession" in Leviticus 14:34 teach that house plagues would not affect the Israelites until they conquered the Land of Israel. Furthermore, if the Israelites had conquered the Land but not yet divided it among the Tribes, or even divided it among the Tribes but not divided it among the families, or even divided it among the families but not given each person his holding, then house plagues would not yet affect the Israelites. It is to teach this result that Leviticus 14:35 says, "he who has the house," teaching that house plagues can occur only to those in the Land of Israel to whom alone the house belongs, excluding these houses that do not belong to an owner alone. Thus the Gemara rejected the explanation based on differences between urban and rural synagogues.

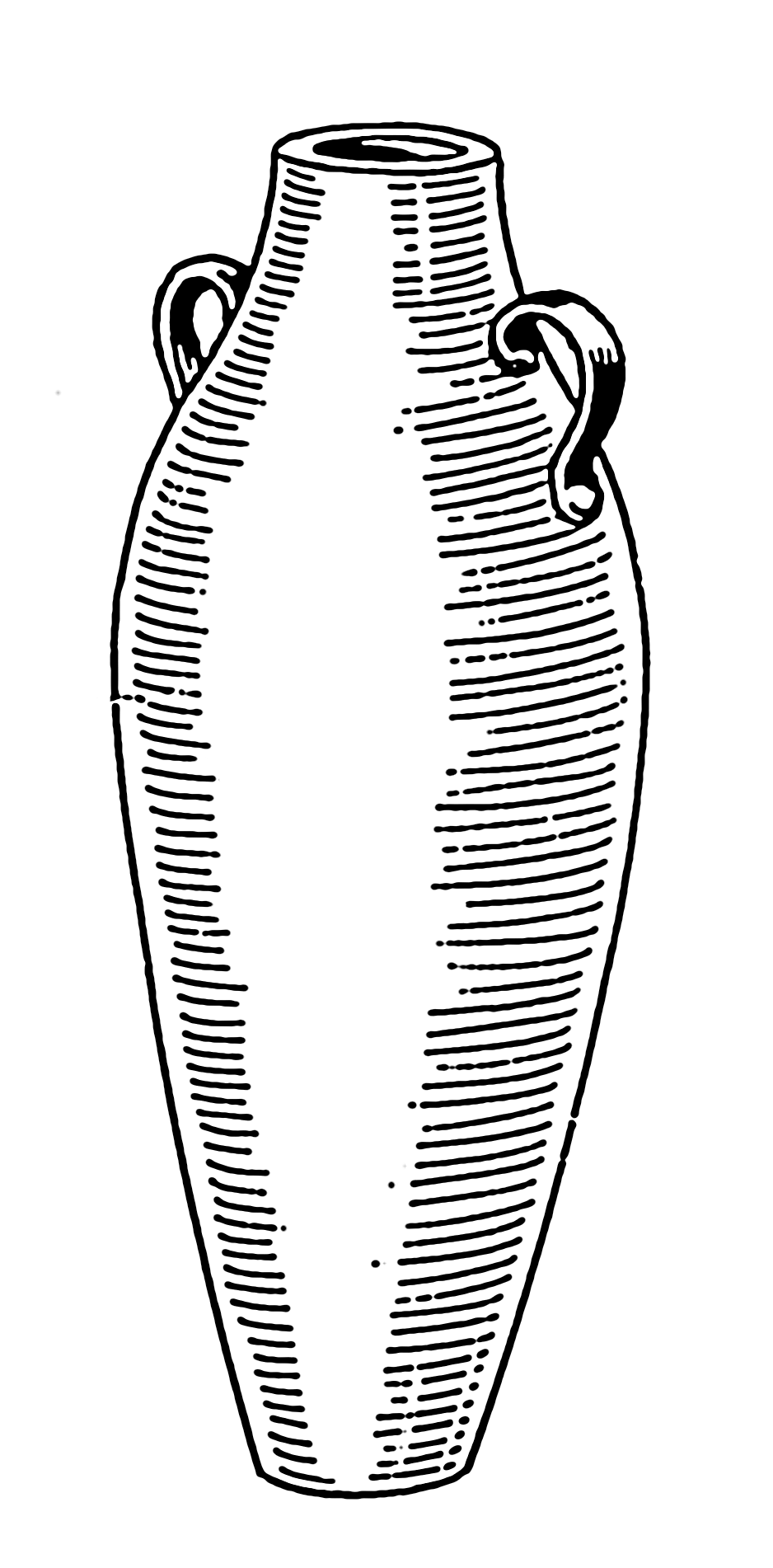
A cruse (drawing by Pearson Scott Foresman)

The Mishnah interpreted the words, "there seems to me to be as it were a plague in the house" in Leviticus 14:35 to teach that even a learned sage who knows that he has definitely seen a sign of plague in a house may not speak with certainty. Rather, even the sage must say, "there seems to me to be as it were a plague in the house."

The Mishnah interpreted the instruction to empty the house in Leviticus 14:36. Rabbi Judah taught that they removed even bundles of wood and even bundles of reeds. Rabbi Simeon remarked that this (removal of bundles that are not susceptible to uncleanness) was idle business. But Rabbi Meir responded by asking which of the homeowner's goods could become unclean. Articles of wood, cloth, or metal surely could be immersed in a ritual bath and become clean. The only thing that the Torah spared was the homeowner's earthenware, even his cruse and his ewer (which, if the house proved unclean, Leviticus 15:12 indicates would have to be broken). If the Torah thus spared a person's humble possessions, how much more so would the Torah spare a person's cherished possessions. If the Torah shows so much consideration for material possessions, how much more so would the Torah show for the lives of a person's children. If the Torah shows so much consideration for the possessions of a wicked person (if we take the plague as a punishment for the sin of slander), how much more so would the Torah show for the possessions of a righteous person.

Reading Leviticus 14:37 to say, "And he shall look on the plague, and behold the plague," the Sifra interpreted the double allusion to teach that a sign of house plague was no cause of uncleanness unless it appeared in at least the size of two split beans. And because Leviticus 14:37 addresses the house's "walls" in the plural, the Sifra taught that a sign of house plague was no cause of uncleanness unless it appeared on at least four walls. Consequently, the Mishnah taught that a round house or a triangular house could not contract uncleanness from a house plague.

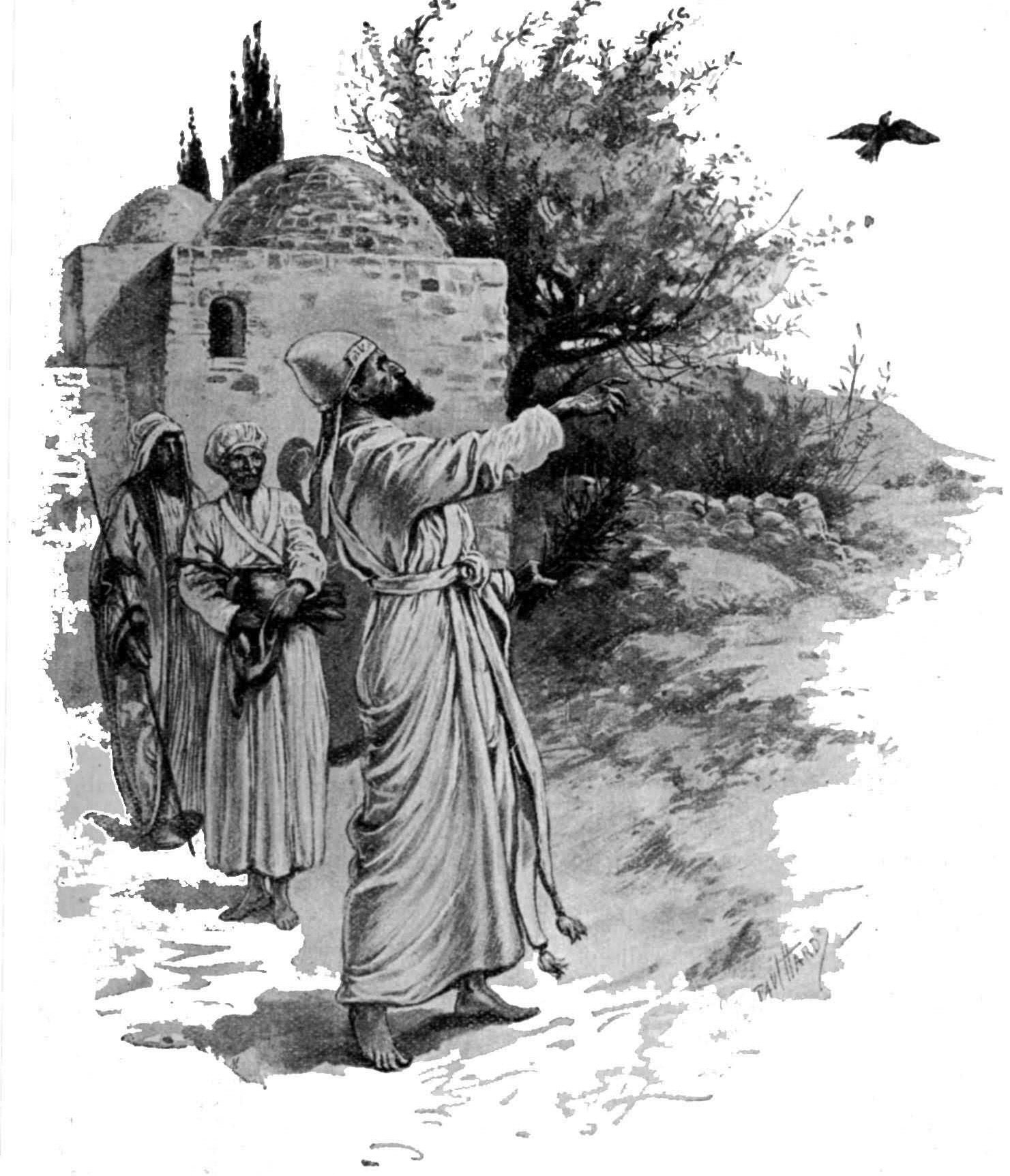
"Let go the living bird" (Leviticus 14:53) (illustration circa 1890–1910 by Paul Hardy)

Because Leviticus 14:40 addresses the house's "stones" in the plural, Rabbi Akiva ruled that a sign of house plague was no cause of uncleanness unless it appeared in at least the size of two split beans on two stones, and not on only one stone. And because Leviticus 14:37 addresses the house's "walls" in the plural, Rabbi Eliezer son of Rabbi Simeon said that a sign of house plague was no cause of uncleanness unless it appeared in the size of two split beans, on two stones, on two walls in a corner, its length being that of two split beans and its breadth that of one split bean.

Because Leviticus 14:45 addresses the "stones," "timber," and "mortar" of the house afflicted by a house plague, the Mishnah taught that only a house made of stones, timber, and mortar could be afflicted by a house plague. And the Mishnah taught that the quantity of wood must be enough to build a threshold, and quantity of mortar must be enough to fill up the space between one row of stones and another.

A Baraita taught that there never was a leprous house within the meaning of Leviticus 14:33–53 and never will be. The Gemara asked why then the law was written and replied that it was so that one may study it and receive reward. But Rabbi Eliezer the son of Rabbi Zadok and Rabbi Simeon of Kefar Acco both cited cases where local tradition reported the ruins of such houses, in Gaza and Galilee, respectively.

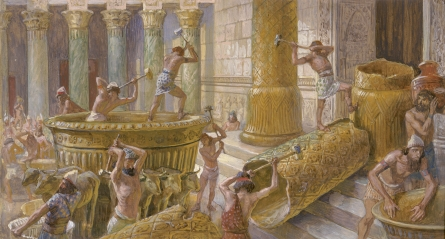
The Chaldees Destroy the Brazen Sea (watercolor circa 1896–1902 by James Tissot)

A Midrash read the discussion of the house stricken with plague in Leviticus 14:33–53 as a prophecy. The Midrash read the words, "and I put the plague of leprosy in a house of the land of your possession," in Leviticus 14:34 to allude to the Temple, about which in Ezekiel 24:21 God says, "I will defile My sanctuary, the pride of your power, the desire of your eyes, and the longing of your soul." The Midrash read the words, "then He whose house it is shall come," in Leviticus 14:35 to allude to God, about Whom Haggai 1:4 says, "Because of My house that lies waste." The Midrash read the words, "and He shall tell the priest," in Leviticus 14:35 to allude to Jeremiah, who Jeremiah 1:1 identified as a priest. The Midrash read the words, "there seems to me to be, as it were, a plague in the house," in Leviticus 14:35 to allude to the idol that King Manasseh set up in 2 Kings 21:7. The Midrash read the words, "and the priest shall command that they empty the house," in Leviticus 14:36 to allude to King Shishak of Egypt, who 1 Kings 14:26 reports, "took away the treasures of the house of the Lord." The Midrash read the words, "and he shall break down the house," in Leviticus 14:45 to allude to King Nebuchadnezzar of Babylon, who Ezra 5:12 reports destroyed the Temple. The Midrash read the words, "and they shall pour out the dust that they have scraped off outside the city," in Leviticus 14:41 to allude to the Israelites taken away to the Babylonian Captivity, whom Ezra 5:12 reports Nebuchadnezzar "carried ... away into Babylon." And the Midrash read the words, "and they shall take other stones, and put them in the place of those stones," in Leviticus 14:42 to allude to the Israelites who would come to restore Israel, and of whom Isaiah 28:16 reports God saying, "Behold, I lay in Zion for a foundation stone, a tried stone, a costly corner-stone of sure foundation; he that believes shall not make haste."

=== Leviticus chapter 15 ===
Tractate Zavim in the Mishnah and Tosefta interpreted the laws of male genital discharges in Leviticus 15:1–18.

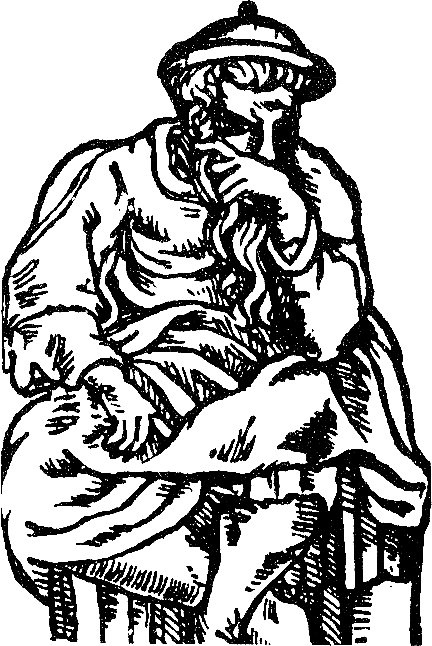
Rabbi Akiva (illustration from the 1568 Mantua Haggadah)

The Mishnah taught that they inquired along seven lines before they determined that a genital discharge rendered a man unclean. A discharge caused by one of these reasons did not render the man impure or subject him to bringing an offering. They asked: (1) about his food, (2) about his drink, (3) what he had carried, (4) whether he had jumped, (5) whether he had been ill, (6) what he had seen, and (7) whether he had obscene thoughts. It did not matter whether he had had thoughts before or after seeing a woman. Rabbi Judah taught that the discharge would not render him unclean if he had watched animals having intercourse or even if he merely saw a woman's dyed garments. Rabbi Akiva taught that the discharge would not render him unclean even if he had eaten any kind of food, good or bad, or had drunk any kind of liquid. The Sages exclaimed to Rabbi Akiva that according to his view, no more men would ever be rendered unclean by genital discharge. Rabbi Akiva replied that one does not have an obligation to ensure that there exist men unclean because of a genital discharges.

The Mishnah taught that even a man who experiences abnormal (nonseminal) genital oozing (a zav within the meaning of Leviticus 15:1–15), whose impurity lasts at least seven days, who experienced a seminal emission, for which, were he not a zav, he would be impure for only one day; a menstruating woman who discharged semen, despite the fact that she is already impure with a severe impurity unaffected by her immersion; and a woman who engaged in conjugal relations with her husband and later saw menstrual blood, all are required to immerse themselves and purify themselves of the impurity of the seminal emission, even though they remain impure due to the more severe impurity. But Rabbi Judah taught that they are exempt from immersion, as even after immersion, they would remain impure due to the more severe impurity.

The Mishnah taught that if the time for the recitation of the Shema arrived and a man is impure due to a seminal emission (as discussed at Leviticus 15:16 and Deuteronomy 23:11), he may contemplate the Shema in his mind, but neither recite the blessings preceding the Shema nor the blessings following it. Over food that, after partaking, one is obligated to recite a blessing, he recites a blessing after, but he does not recite a blessing before. In each of these instances, Rabbi Judah taught that he recites the blessings before and after.

Rabbi Eleazar ben Ḥisma taught that even the apparently arcane laws of bird offerings in Leviticus 12:8 and menstrual cycles in Leviticus 12:1–8 and 15:19–33 are essential laws.

Tractate Niddah in the Mishnah, Tosefta, Jerusalem Talmud, and Babylonian Talmud interpreted the laws of menstruation in Leviticus 15:19–33.

Rabbi Meir taught that the Torah ordained that menstruation should separate a wife from her husband for seven days, because if the husband were in constant contact with his wife, the husband might become disenchanted with her. The Torah, therefore, ordained that a wife might be unclean for seven days (and therefore forbidden to her husband for marital relations) so that she should become as desirable to her husband as when she first entered the bridal chamber.

The Mishnah taught that all women are presumed clean for their husbands (and for the purpose of marital relations, no examination is required). The Mishnah taught that it is also true for men who return from a journey that their wives are presumed clean.

Interpreting the beginning of menstrual cycles, as in Leviticus 15:19–33, the Mishnah ruled that if a woman loses track of her menstrual cycle, there is no return to the beginning of the niddah count in fewer than seven, nor more than seventeen days.

The Mishnah taught that a woman may attribute a bloodstain to any external cause to which she can possibly attribute it and thus regard herself as clean. If, for instance, she had killed an animal, she was handling bloodstains, she had sat beside those who handled bloodstains, or she had killed a louse, she may attribute the stain to those external causes.

The Mishnah related that a woman once came to Rabbi Akiva and told him that she had observed a bloodstain. He asked her whether she perhaps had a wound. She replied that she had a wound, but it had healed. He asked whether it was possible that it could open again and bleed. She answered in the affirmative, and Rabbi Akiva declared her clean. Observing that his disciples looked at each other in astonishment, he told them that the Sages did not lay down the rule for bloodstains to create a strict result but rather to produce a lenient result, for Leviticus 15:19 says, "If a woman has an issue, and her issue in her flesh is blood"—only blood, not a bloodstain.

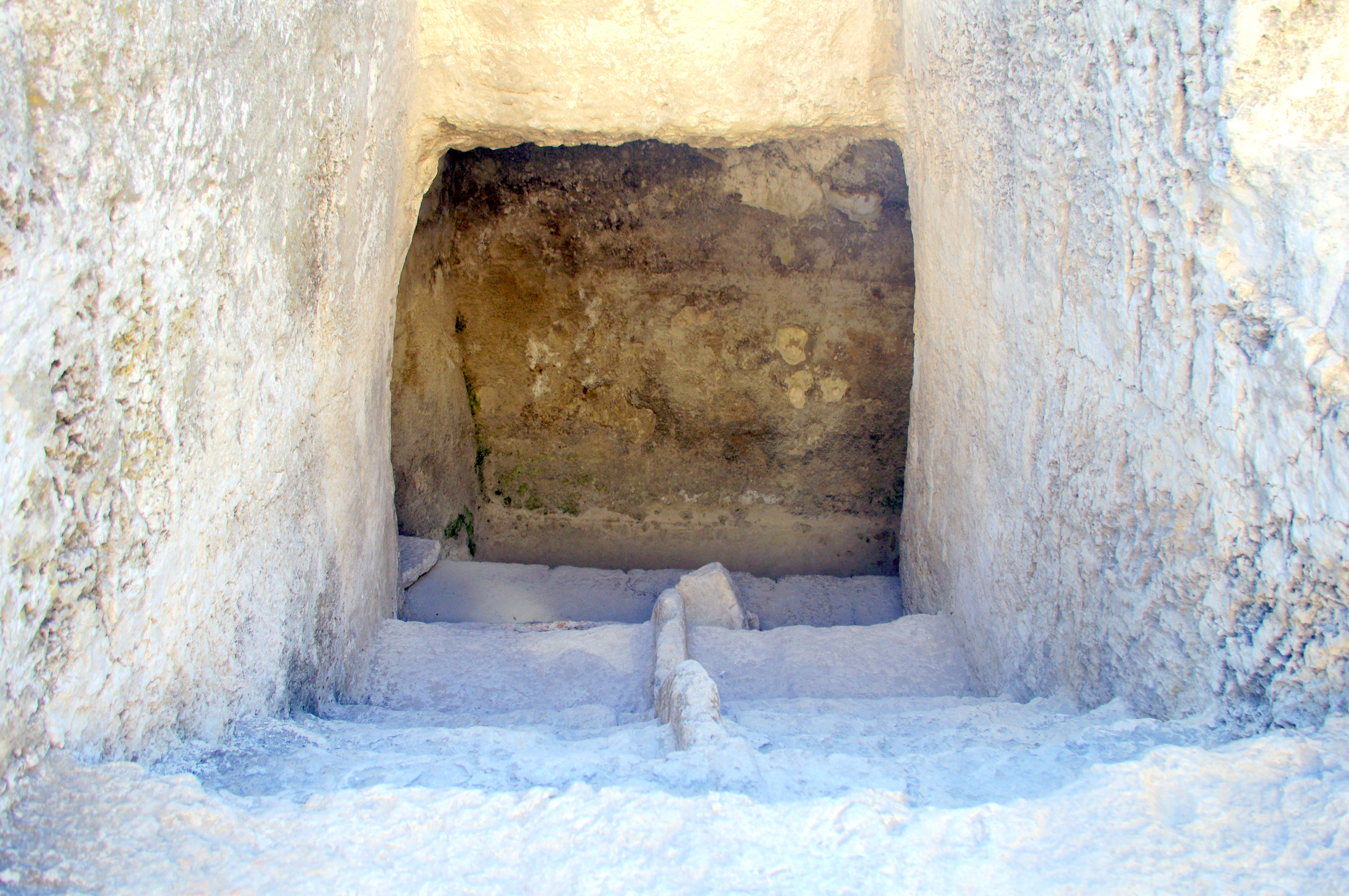
An ancient mikveh on the Temple Mount in Jerusalem

Tractate Mikvaot in the Mishnah and Tosefta interpreted the laws of the ritual bath (מִקְוֶה, mikveh) prescribed for the cleansing of menstruants in Leviticus 15:19–33.

The Mishnah taught that there are six grades of ritual baths, each higher than the other. The first is rainwater in a water hole. Superior to that is the water of rain drippings that have not stopped. Superior to that is the water of a mikveh containing 40 se'ahs of water, for in such a mikveh persons may immerse themselves and immerse others. Superior to that is the water of a fountain whose own water is little but has been increased by a greater quantity of drawn water. Superior to that are salty or hot waters from a spring, which can render clean when flowing. And superior to that are living waters, which serve for the immersion of persons who have a running issue and for the sprinkling of persons with skin disease, and are valid for the preparation of the water of purification.

The Mishnah taught that any pool of water that mingles with the water of a mikveh is as valid as the mikveh itself. The Mishnah taught that one may immerse in holes and crevices of a cavern just as they are, but one may not immerse in the pit of a cavern except if it has an opening as big as the tube of a water skin. Rabbi Judah taught that this is the case when it stands by itself (and forms an independent pool separated by a wall from the pool in the cavern), but if it does not stand by itself, one may immerse in it just as it is (for it is part of the pool in the cavern).

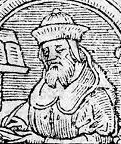
Rashi

== In medieval Jewish interpretation ==
The parashah is discussed in these medieval Jewish sources:

=== Leviticus chapter 14 ===
Rashi reported an interpretation by Rabbi Moshe ha-Darshan (the preacher) that since the Levites were submitted in atonement for the firstborn who had practiced idolatry when they worshipped the Golden Calf (in Exodus 32), and Psalm 106:28 calls idol worship "sacrifices to the dead," and in Numbers 12:12 Moses called one afflicted with skin disease (צָּרַעַת, tzara'at) "as one dead," and Leviticus 14:8 required those afflicted with skin disease to shave, therefore God required the Levites too to shave.

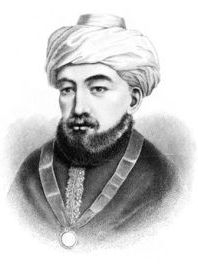
Maimonides

=== Leviticus chapter 15 ===
Maimonides noted that touching one oozing flux (Leviticus 15:2), touching the bedding of one with skin disease (Leviticus 15:5), or touching a menstruant woman (Leviticus 15:18) kept one out of the Sanctuary—as did contact with a corpse (Leviticus 11:27), touching one of the eight kinds of vermin (Leviticus 11:29–30), having skin disease (Leviticus 13:46), touching one with skin disease (Leviticus 13:46), having a nocturnal emission, or having sexual relations. All these events kept people out of the Sanctuary, preventing merely casual visits. Maimonides reasoned that there are so many causes of impurity that few people would have been ritually pure. Maimonides argued that God barred impure people from the Sanctuary with the intention that visiting it would be rare, so that constant contact with the Sanctuary would not diminish its emotional impact. This would thus further the object of the Sanctuary to inspire reverence and awe in those who did come to it; as God enjoins in Leviticus 19:30, "Revere My Sanctuary."

== In modern interpretation ==
The parashah is discussed in these modern sources:

=== Leviticus chapters 12–15 ===
Jay Sklar identified the following chiastic structure in Leviticus 12–15:

A—impurity resulting from loss of bodily fluids (blood lost in childbirth) (Leviticus 12)

B—impurity resulting from ritually defiling disease (Leviticus 13–14)

A'—impurity resulting from loss of bodily fluids (genital discharges) (Leviticus 15)

=== Leviticus chapter 14 ===
Ephraim Speiser wrote that the word “Torah” (תּוֹרָה) is based on a verbal stem signifying “to teach, guide,” and the like, and the derived noun can carry a variety of meanings, including in Leviticus 13:59, 14:2, 54, and 57, specific rituals for what is sometimes called leprosy. Speiser argued that in context, the word cannot be mistaken for the title of the Pentateuch as a whole.

Jacob Milgrom said that reddish substances, surrogates for blood, were among the ingredients of the purificatory rites for scale-diseased and corpse-contaminated persons, symbolizing the victory of the forces of life over death.

=== Leviticus chapter 15 ===
Elaine Goodfriend argued that the regulations of menstruation in Leviticus 15:19–24 probably had a smaller practical impact on women in ancient Israel than one might imagine, as women at that time probably menstruated less frequently than modern women due to sparser diet, more-frequent pregnancies, and longer breast-feeding (typically three years), all of which would have reduced their number of menstrual cycles.

Shaye Cohen said that the only element in common between the “ritual” or physical impurities of Leviticus 11–15 and the “dangerous” or sinful impurities of Leviticus 18 is intercourse with a menstruant.

== Commandments ==
According to the Sefer ha-Chinuch, there are 11 positive and no negative commandments in the parashah:

- To carry out the prescribed rules for purifying the person affected by skin disease (צָּרַעַת, tzara'at)
- The person affected by skin disease (צָּרַעַת, tzara'at) must shave off all his hair prior to purification.
- Every impure person must immerse in a mikveh to become pure.
- A person affected by skin disease (צָּרַעַת, tzara'at) must bring an offering after going to the mikveh.
- To observe the laws of impurity caused by a house's צָּרַעַת, tzara'at
- To observe the laws of impurity caused by a man's running issue
- A man who had a running issue must bring an offering after he goes to the mikveh.
- To observe the laws of impurity of a seminal emission
- To observe the laws of menstrual impurity
- To observe the laws of impurity caused by a woman's running issue
- A woman who had a running issue must bring an offering after she goes to the mikveh.

== In the liturgy ==
Some Jews refer to the guilt offerings for skin disease in Leviticus 14:10–12 as part of readings on the offerings after the Sabbath morning blessings.

Following the Shacharit morning prayer service, some Jews recite the Six Remembrances, among which is Deuteronomy 24:9, "Remember what the Lord your God did to Miriam by the way as you came forth out of Egypt," recalling that God punished Miriam with צָּרַעַת, tzara'at.

The laws of a house afflicted with plague in Leviticus 14:34–53 provide an application of the twelfth of the Thirteen Rules for interpreting the Torah in the Baraita of Rabbi Ishmael that many Jews read as part of the readings before the Pesukei d'Zimrah prayer service. The twelfth rule provides that one may elucidate a matter from its context or from a passage following it. Leviticus 14:34–53 describes the laws of the house afflicted with plague generally. But because Leviticus 14:45 instructs what to do with the "stones ... timber ... and all the mortar of the house," the Rabbis interpret the laws of the house afflicted with plague to apply only to houses made of stones, timber, and mortar.

== Haftarah ==
The haftarah for the parashah is 2 Kings 7:3–20.

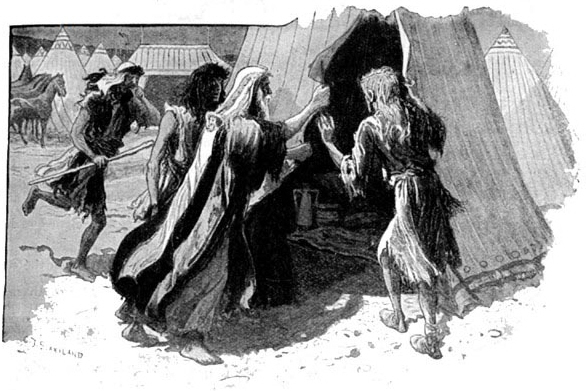
The lepers went into a tent (illustration by Charles Joseph Staniland (1838–1916))

=== Summary ===
During the Arameans' siege of Samaria, four leprous men at the gate asked each other why they should die there of starvation, when they might go to the Arameans, who would either save them or leave them no worse than they were. When at twilight, they went to the Arameans' camp, there was no one there, for God had made the Arameans hear chariots, horses, and a great army, and fearing the Hittites and the Egyptians, they fled, leaving their tents, their horses, their donkeys, and their camp. The lepers went into a tent, ate and drank, and carried away silver, gold, and clothing from the tents and hid it.

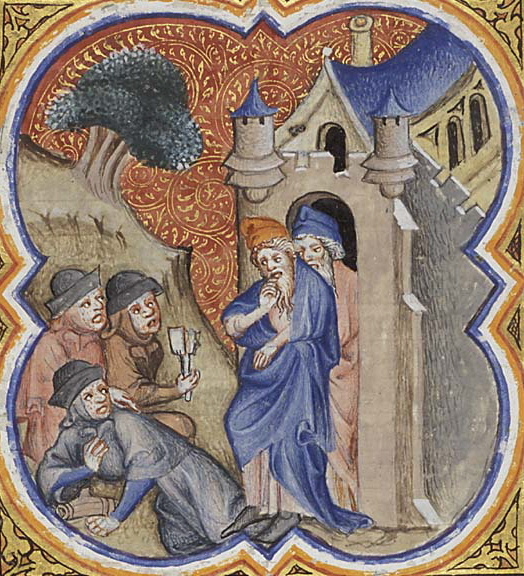
The four lepers bring the news to the guards at the gate of Samaria (illumination from Petrus Comestor's 1372 Bible Historiale)

Feeling qualms of guilt, they went to go tell the king of Samaria, and called to the porters of the city telling them what they had seen, and the porters told the king's household within. The king arose in the night, and told his servants that he suspected that the Arameans had hidden in the field, thinking that when the Samaritans came out, they would be able to get into the city. One of his servants suggested that some men take five of the horses that remained and go see, and they took two chariots with horses to go and see. They went after the Arameans as far as the Jordan River, and all the way was littered with garments and vessels that the Arameans had cast away in their haste, and the messengers returned and told the king. So the people went out and looted Arameans' camp, so that the market price of; a measure (seah) of fine flour (about six dry qt., six lb. or three kg.) and two seahs of barley meal; each dropped to one shekel in price, as God's prophet had said it would. And the king appointed the captain on whom he leaned to take charge of the gate, and the people trampled him and killed him before he could taste of the flour, just as the man of God Elisha had said.

==== Connection to the parashah ====
Both the parashah and the haftarah deal with people stricken with skin disease. Both the parashah and the haftarah employ the term for the person affected by skin disease (מְּצֹרָע, metzora). Just before Parashat Metzora, in the sister parashah Tazria, Leviticus 13:46 provides that the person with skin disease "shall dwell alone; without the camp shall his dwelling be," thus explaining why the four leprous men in the haftarah lived outside the gate.

Rabbi Johanan taught that the four leprous men at the gate in 2 Kings 7:3 were none other than Elisha's former servant Gehazi (whom the Midrash, above, cited as having been stricken with leprosy for profanation of the Divine Name) and his three sons.

In the parashah, when there "seems" to be a plague in the house, the priest must not jump to conclusions, but must examine the facts. Just before the opening of the haftarah, in 2 Kings 7:2, the captain on whom the king leaned jumps to the conclusion that Elisha's prophecy could not come true, and the captain meets his punishment in 2 Kings 7:17 and 19.

==== The haftarah in classical rabbinic interpretation ====
Reading 2 Kings 7:3–4, "Now there were four leprous men at the entrance of the gate; and they said one to another: 'Why do we sit here until we die? If we say: "We will enter into the city," then the famine is in the city, and we shall die there; and if we sit still here, we die also. Now therefore come, and let us go to the host of the Arameans; if they save us alive, we shall live; and if they kill us, we shall but die,’" and Genesis 12:10, "And there was a famine in the land; and Abram went down into Egypt to sojourn there," the Rabbis deduced that when there is a famine a place, one should migrate elsewhere. And the Gemara taught that the Rabbis cited 2 Kings 7:4 in addition to Genesis 12:10, because one might think from Genesis 12:10 that this advice applies only where there is no danger to life in the destination. So they also cited 2 Kings 7:4, "Now therefore come, and let us go to the host of the Arameans; if they save us alive, we shall live."

==== The haftarah in modern interpretation ====
Choon-Leong Seow said that lepers, outcasts of society, discovered that the Arameans had deserted their camp, and it was through them that the news came to the Israelites, while those in power doubted divine deliverance. And while the faithless king did not accept the news, a nameless servant provided a solution that led to the fulfillment of prophecy. Thus, God brought about salvation for the Israelites through the outcasts and the lowly of society.

=== On Shabbat HaGadol ===
When the parashah coincides with Shabbat HaGadol (the "Great Shabbat," the special Sabbath immediately before Passover—as it does in 2019, 2022, 2024, and 2027), the haftarah is Malachi 3:4-24.

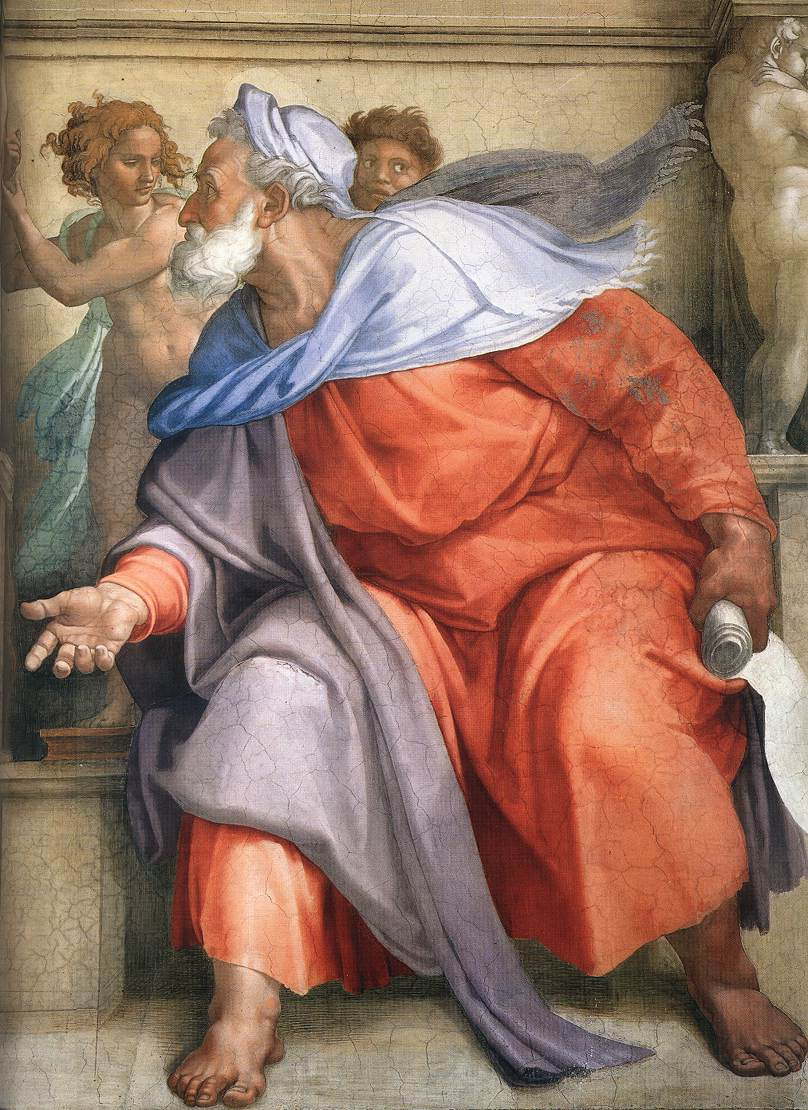
Ezekiel (1510 fresco by Michelangelo from the Sistine Chapel)

=== On Shabbat HaChodesh ===
When the parashah coincides with Shabbat HaChodesh ("Sabbath [of] the month," the special Sabbath preceding the Hebrew month of Nissan—as it did in 2008), the haftarah is:

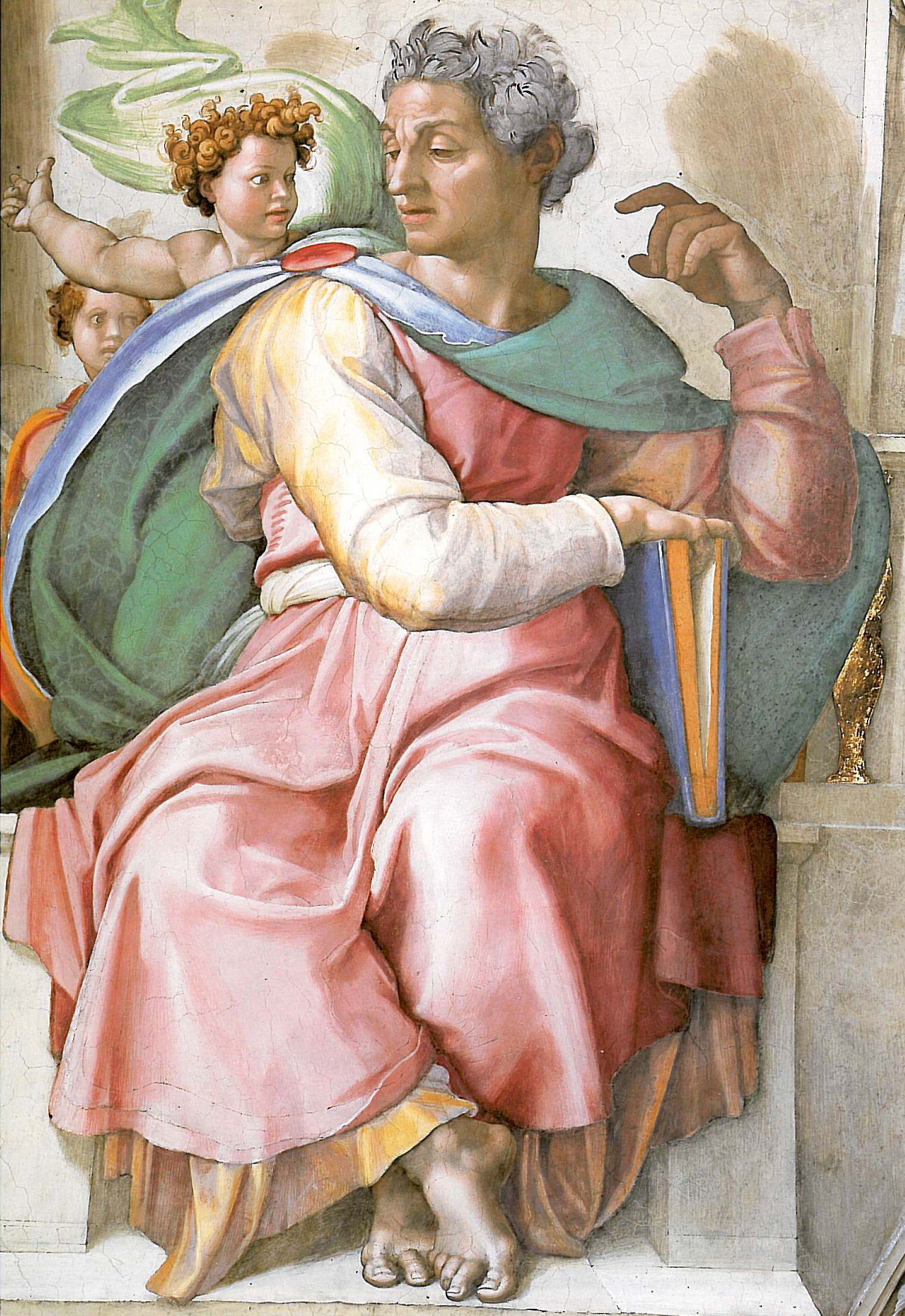
Isaiah (fresco circa 1508–1512 by Michelangelo from the Sistine Chapel)

- for Ashkenazi Jews: Ezekiel 45:16–46:18
- for Sephardi Jews: Ezekiel 45:18–46:15

==== Connection to the special Sabbath ====
On Shabbat HaChodesh, Jews read Exodus 12:1–20, in which God commands that "This month [Nissan] shall be the beginning of months; it shall be the first month of the year," and in which God issued the commandments of Passover. Similarly, the haftarah in Ezekiel 45:21–25 discusses Passover. In both the special reading and the haftarah, God instructs the Israelites to apply blood to doorposts.

=== On Shabbat Rosh Chodesh ===
When the parashah coincides with Shabbat Rosh Chodesh (as it did in 2009), the haftarah is Isaiah 66:1–24.
