= Re'eh =

Torah portion

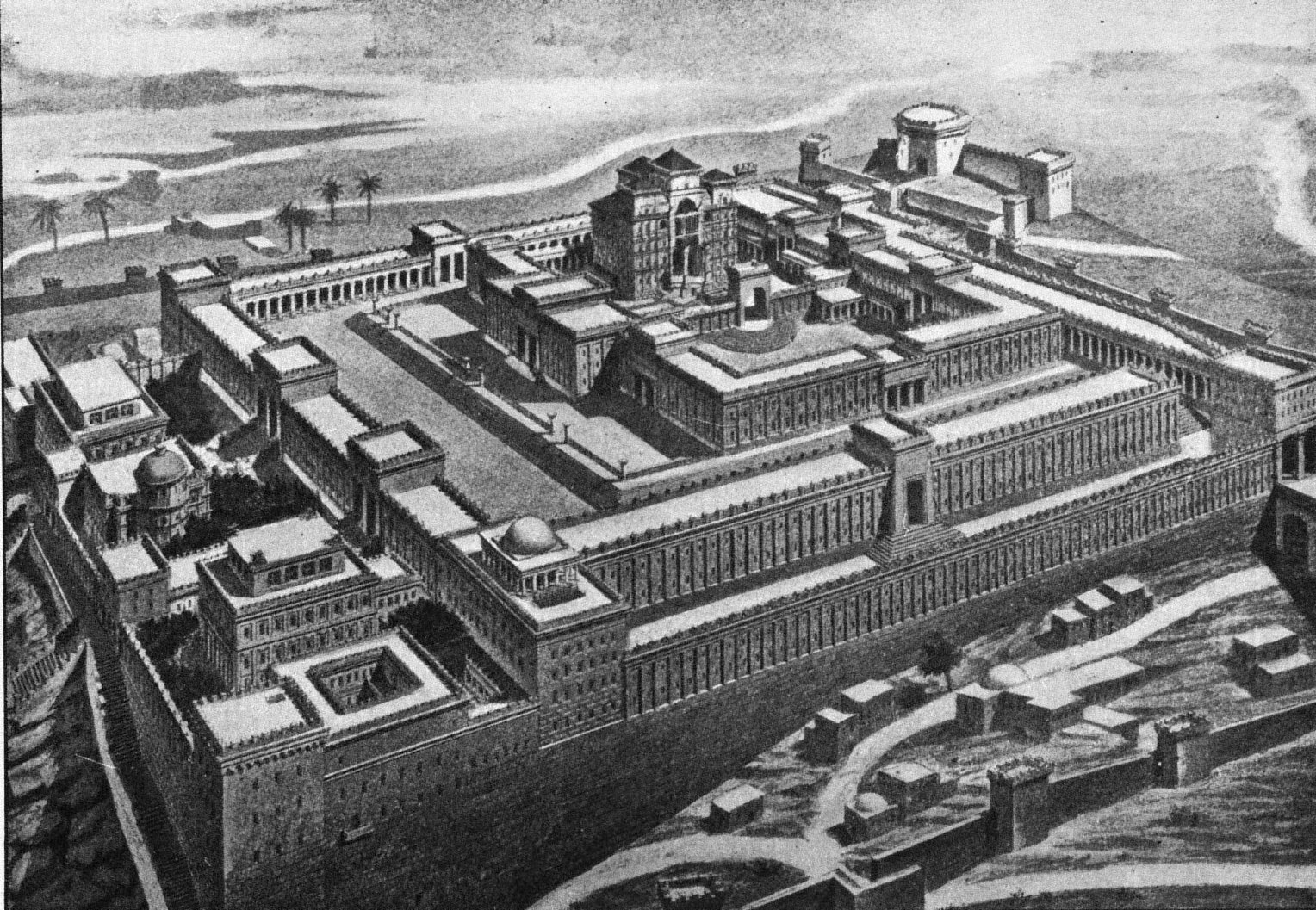
An artist's impression of Solomon's Temple from the Nordisk familjebok. Some see the centralization of Jewish worship in Jerusalem as the intention of Deuteronomy 12.

Re'eh, Reeh, or R'eih (רְאֵה—Hebrew for "see", the first word in the parashah) is the 47th weekly Torah portion (פָּרָשָׁה, parashah) in the annual Jewish cycle of Torah reading and the fourth in the Book of Deuteronomy. It comprises Deuteronomy 11:26–16:17. In the parashah, Moses set before the Israelites the choice between blessings and curses. Moses instructed the Israelites in laws that they were to observe, including the law of a single centralized place of worship. Moses warned against following other gods and their prophets and set forth the laws of kashrut, tithes, the Sabbatical year, Hebrew slave redemption, firstborn animals, and the Three Pilgrimage Festivals.

The parashah is the longest weekly Torah portion in the Book of Deuteronomy (although not in the Torah), and is made up of 7,442 Hebrew letters, 1,932 Hebrew words, 126 verses, and 258 lines in a Torah scroll. Rabbinic Jews generally read it in August or early September. Jews read part of the parashah, Deuteronomy 15:19–16:17, which addresses the Three Pilgrim Festivals, as the initial Torah reading on the eighth day of Passover when it falls on a weekday and on the second day of Shavuot when it falls on a weekday. Jews read a more extensive selection from the same part of the parashah, Deuteronomy 14:22–16:17, as the initial Torah reading on the eighth day of Passover when it falls on Shabbat, on the second day of Shavuot when it falls on Shabbat, and on Shemini Atzeret.

== Readings ==
In traditional Sabbath Torah reading, the parashah is divided into seven readings, or עליות, aliyot. In the Masoretic Text of the Tanakh (Hebrew Bible), Parashat Re'eh has six "open portion" (פתוחה, petuchah) divisions (roughly equivalent to paragraphs, often abbreviated with the Hebrew letter פ (peh)). Parashat Re'eh has several further subdivisions, called "closed portions" (סתומה, setumah) (abbreviated with the Hebrew letter ס (samekh)) within the open portion divisions. The first open portion spans the first, second, and part of the third readings. The second open portion goes from the middle of the third reading to the end of the fourth reading. The third open portion spans the fifth and sixth readings. The fourth, fifth, and sixth open portion divisions divide the seventh reading. Closed portion divisions further divide each of the seven readings.

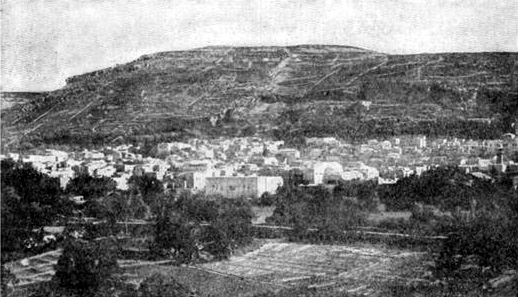
Mount Gerizim

=== First reading—Deuteronomy 11:26–12:10 ===
In the first reading, Moses told the Israelites that he set before them blessing and curse: blessing if they obeyed God's commandments and curse if they did not obey but turned away to follow other gods. A closed portion ends here.

In the continuation of the reading, Moses directed that when God brought them into the land, they were to pronounce the blessings at Mount Gerizim and the curses at Mount Ebal. Moses instructed the Israelites in the laws that they were to observe in the land: They were to destroy all the sites at which the residents worshiped their gods. They were not to worship God as the land's residents had worshiped their gods, but to look only to the site that God would choose. There they were to bring their offerings and feast before God, happy in all God's blessings. The first reading ends with Deuteronomy 12:10.

=== Second reading—Deuteronomy 12:11–28 ===
In the second reading, Moses warned the Israelites were to sacrifice burnt offerings only in the place that God would choose. But whenever they desired, they could slaughter and eat meat in any of their settlements, so long as they did not consume the blood, which they were to pour on the ground. They were not, however, to consume in their settlements their tithes, firstlings, vow offerings, freewill offerings, or contributions; these they were to consume along with their children, slaves, and local Levites in the place that God would choose. A closed portion ends with Deuteronomy 12:19.

In the continuation of the reading, Moses made clear that even as God gave the Israelites more land, they could eat meat in their settlements, so long as they did not consume the blood, and so long as they brought their offerings to the place that God would show them. The second reading and a closed portion end with Deuteronomy 12:28.

14th–12th century B.C.E. bronze figurine of the Canaanite god Baal, found in Ras Shamra (ancient Ugarit), now at the Louvre

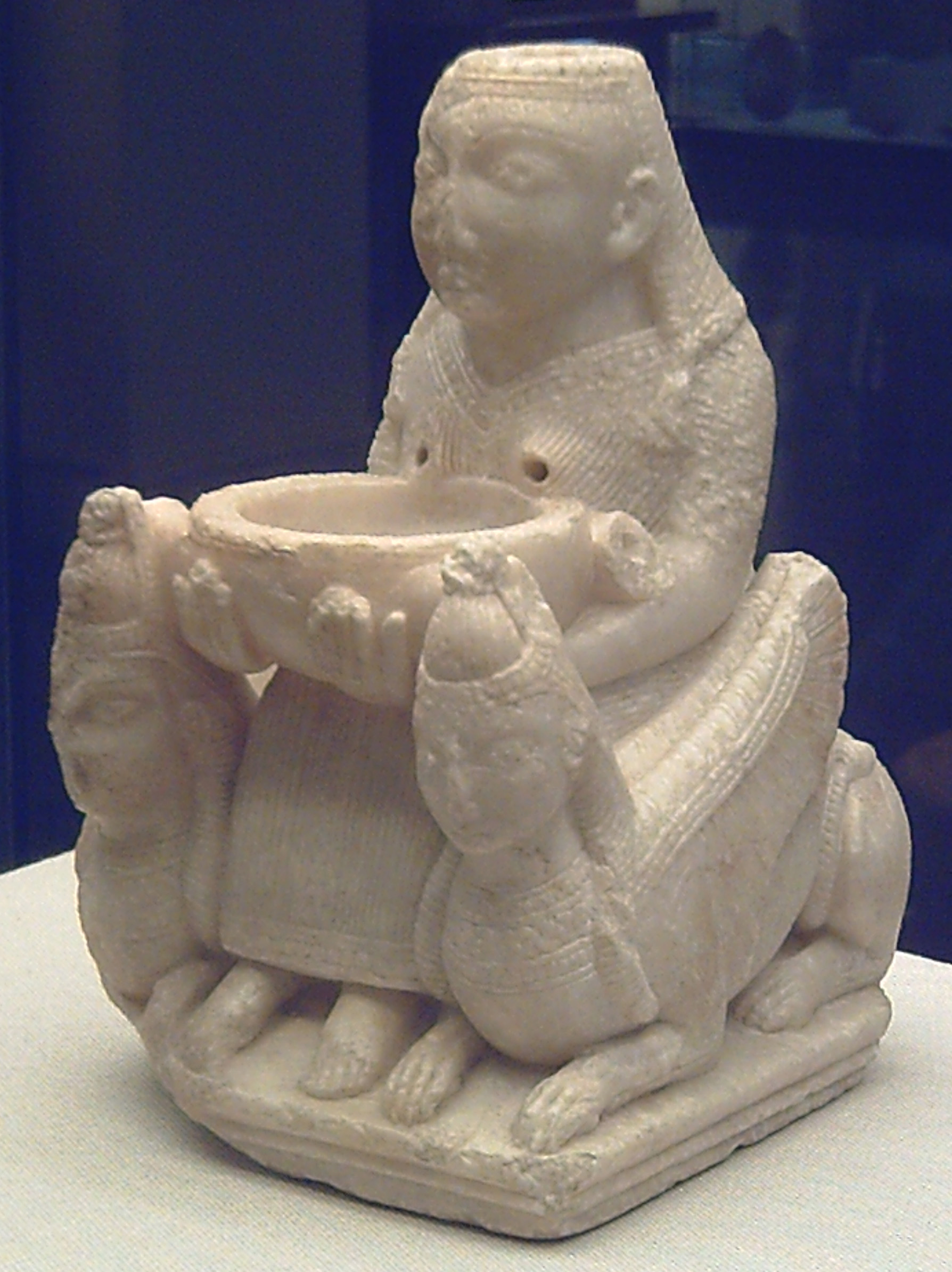
7th century B.C.E. alabaster Phoenician figure probably of the Canaanite goddess Astarte, now at the National Archaeological Museum of Spain

=== Third reading—Deuteronomy 12:29–13:19 ===
In the third reading, Moses warned them against being lured into the ways of the residents of the land, and against inquiring about their gods, for the residents performed for their gods every abhorrent act that God detested, even offering up their children in fire to their gods. Moses warned the Israelites carefully to observe only that which he enjoined upon them, neither adding to it nor taking away from it. The first open portion ends here.

In the continuation of the reading, Moses instructed that if a prophet (נבָיִא, navi) appeared before the Israelites and gave them a sign or a portent and urged them to worship another god, even if the sign or portent came true, they were not to heed the words of that prophet, but put the offender to death. A closed portion ends here.

In a further continuation of the reading, Moses instructed that if a brother, son, daughter, wife, or close friend enticed one in secret to worship other gods, the Israelites were to show no pity but stone the offender to death. Another closed portion ends here.

And as the reading continues, Moses instructed that if the Israelites heard that some scoundrels had subverted the inhabitants of a town to worship other gods, the Israelites were to investigate thoroughly, and if they found it true, they were to destroy the inhabitants and cattle of that town (an עיר נידחת, Ir nidachat) burning the town and everything in it. They were not to rebuild on the site. The third reading and a closed portion end here with the end of the chapter.

=== Fourth reading—Deuteronomy 14:1–21 ===
In the fourth reading, Moses prohibited the Israelites from gashing themselves or shaving the front of their heads because of the dead. A closed portion ends with Deuteronomy 14:2.

In the continuation of the reading, Moses prohibited the Israelites from eating anything abhorrent. Among land animals, they could eat ox, sheep, goat, deer, gazelle, roebuck, wild goat, ibex, antelope, mountain sheep, and any other animal that has true hoofs that are cleft in two and chews cud. But the Israelites were not to eat or touch the carcasses of camel, hare, daman, or swine. A closed portion ends here.

In the next part of the reading, Moses instructed that of animals that live in water, the Israelites could eat anything that has fins and scales, but nothing else. Another closed portion ends here.

As the reading continues, Moses instructed that the Israelites could eat any clean bird, but could not eat eagle, vulture, black vulture, kite, falcon, buzzard, raven, ostrich, nighthawk, sea gull, hawk, owl, pelican, bustard, cormorant, stork, heron, hoopoe, or bat. They could not eat any winged swarming things. They could not eat anything that had died a natural death, but they could give it to a stranger or sell it to a foreigner. They could not boil a kid in its mother's milk. The fourth reading and the second open portion end here.

=== Fifth reading—Deuteronomy 14:22–29 ===
In the fifth reading, Moses instructed that the Israelites were to set aside every year a tenth part of their harvest. They were to consume the tithes of their new grain, wine, and oil, and the firstlings of their herds and flocks in the place where God would choose. If the distance to that place was too great, they could convert the tithes or firstlings into money, take the proceeds to the place that God had chosen, and spend the money and feast there. They were not to neglect the Levite in their community, for the Levites had no hereditary portion of land. A closed portion ends here.

In the continuation of the reading, Moses instructed that every third year, the Israelites were to take the full tithe, but leave it within their settlements, and the Levite, the proselyte, the orphan, and the widow in their settlements could come and eat. The fifth reading and a closed portion end here with the end of the chapter.

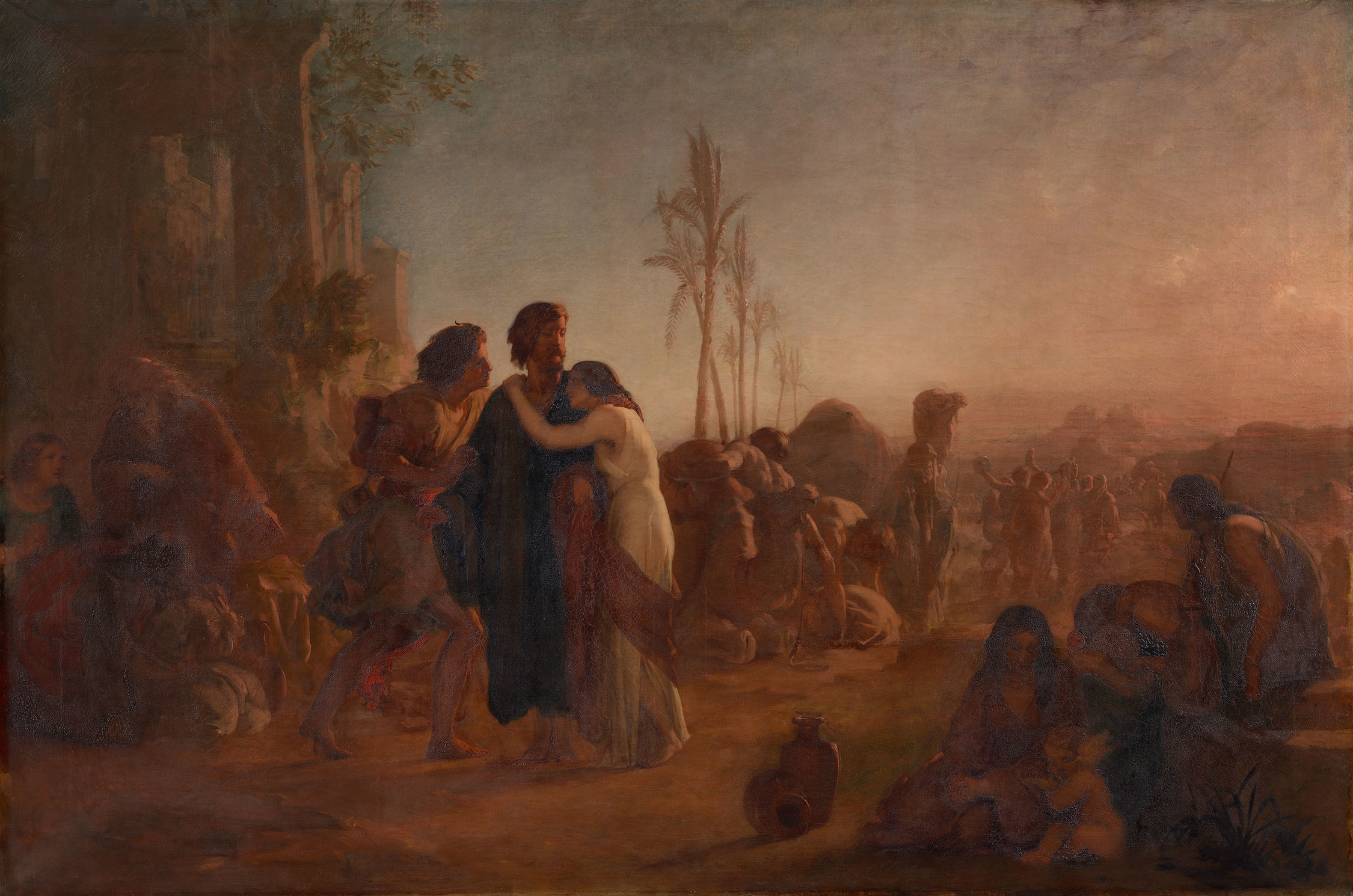
The Liberation of Slaves (Henry Le Jeune, oil on canvas, 1847)

=== Sixth reading—Deuteronomy 15:1–18 ===
In the sixth reading, Moses described "the Lord's Release", stating that every seventh year, the Israelites were to remit debts from fellow Israelites, although they could continue to dun foreigners. There would be no needy among them if only they kept all God's laws, for God would bless them. A closed portion ends here.

In the continuation of the reading, Moses instructed that if one of their kinsmen fell into need, the Israelites were not to harden their hearts, but were to open their hands and lend what the kinsman needed. The Israelites were not to harbor the base thought that the year of remission was approaching and not lend, but they were to lend readily to their kinsman, for in return God would bless them in all their efforts. A closed portion ends with Deuteronomy 15:11.

In the continuation of the reading, Moses instructed that if a fellow Hebrew was sold into servitude, the Hebrew slave would serve six years, and in the seventh year go free. When the master set the slave free, the master was to give the former slave parting gifts. Should the slave tell the master that the slave did not want to leave, the master was to take an awl and put it through the slave's ear into the door, and the slave was to become the master's slave in perpetuity. The sixth reading and the third open portion end with Deuteronomy 15:18.

=== Seventh reading—Deuteronomy 15:19–16:17 ===
In the seventh reading, Moses instructed that the Israelites were to consecrate to God all male firstlings born in their herds and flocks and eat them with their household in the place that God would choose. If such an animal had a defect, the Israelites were not to sacrifice it, but eat it in their settlements, as long as they poured out its blood on the ground. The fourth open portion ends here with the chapter.

In the continuation of the reading, Moses instructed the Israelites to observe Passover, Shavuot, and Sukkot. Three times a year, on those three festivals, all Israelite men were to appear in the place that God would choose, each with his own gift, according to the blessing that God had bestowed upon him. A closed portion ends with the conclusion of the discussion of Passover at Deuteronomy 16:8, and the fifth open portion ends with the conclusion of the discussion of Shavuot at Deuteronomy 16:12. The maftir (מפטיר) reading of Deuteronomy 16:13–17 concludes the parashah with the discussion of Sukkot, and Deuteronomy 16:17 concludes the final closed portion.

=== Readings according to the triennial cycle ===
Jews who read the Torah according to the triennial cycle of Torah reading read the parashah according to the following schedule:

	Year 1	Year 2	Year 3
	2026, 2029, 2032 ...	2027, 2030, 2033 ...	2028, 2031, 2034 ...
Reading	11:26–12:28	12:29–14:29	15:1–16:17
1	11:26–31	12:29–13:1	15:1–6
2	11:32–12:5	13:2–6	15:7–11
3	12:6–10	13:7–12	15:12–18
4	12:11–16	13:13–19	15:19–23
5	12:17–19	14:1–8	16:1–8
6	12:20–25	14:9–21	16:9–12
7	12:26–28	14:22–29	16:13–17
Maftir	12:26–28	14:22–29	16:13–17

== In inner-biblical interpretation ==
The parashah has parallels or is discussed in these Biblical sources:

=== Deuteronomy chapter 11 ===
Deuteronomy 11:29 alludes to the ceremony of the blessings and curses detailed in Deuteronomy 27:12–28:69. Joshua 8:33 reports the Israelites carried out the ceremony "as Moses the servant of the Lord had commanded at the first."

=== Deuteronomy chapter 12 ===
Benjamin Sommer argued that Deuteronomy 12–26 borrowed whole sections from the earlier text of Exodus 21–23.

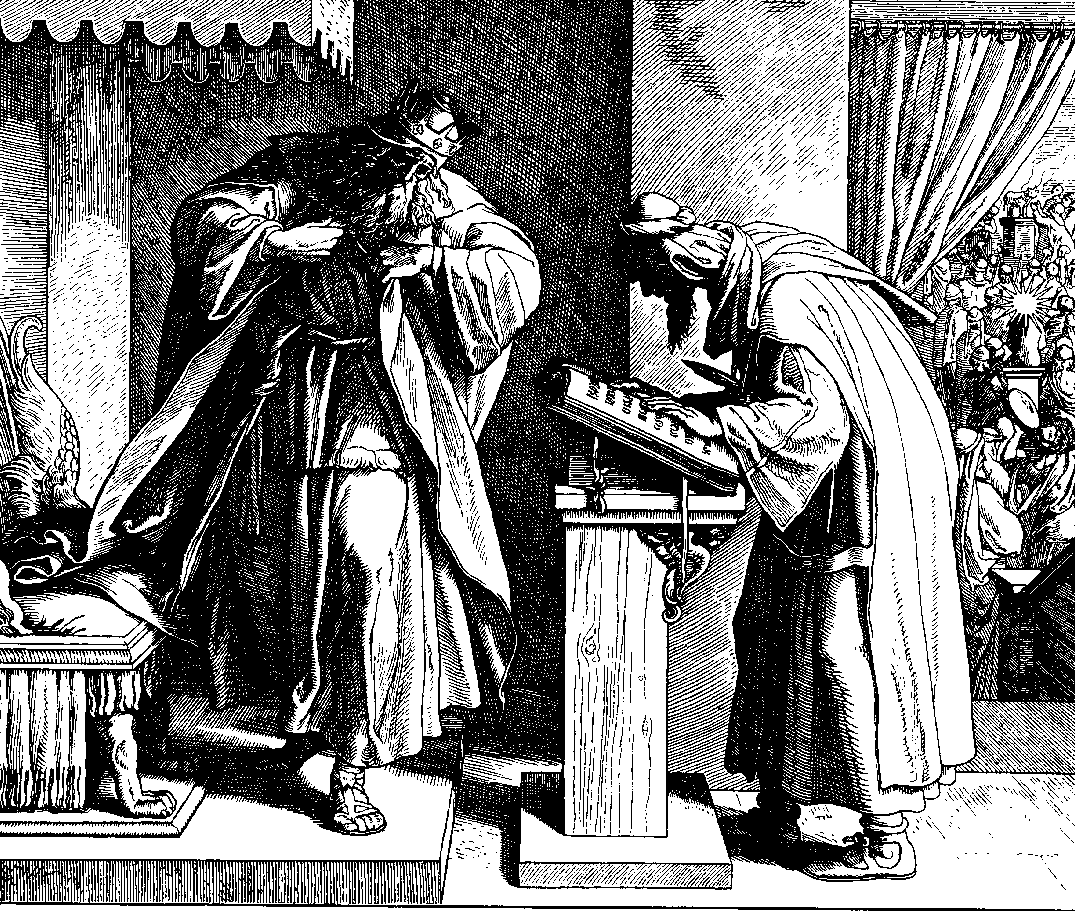
Josiah hearing the reading of Deuteronomy (illustration by Julius Schnorr von Carolsfeld)

Leviticus 17:1–10, like Deuteronomy 12:1–28, addresses the centralization of sacrifices and the permissibility of eating meat. Leviticus 17:3–4 prohibited killing an ox, lamb, or goat (each a sacrificial animal) without bringing it to the door of the Tabernacle as an offering to God. Deuteronomy 12:15, however, allows killing and eating meat in any place.

Deuteronomy 12:23 and 15:23 prohibit consuming blood. The Torah states similar prohibitions of consuming blood in Genesis 9:4; Leviticus 3:17; 7:26; 17:10–12.

2 Kings 23:1–25 and 2 Chronicles 34:1–33 recount how King Josiah implemented the centralization called for in Deuteronomy 12:1–19.

Deuteronomy 12:5–6 commanded the Israelite people to "look only to the site that the Lord your God will choose amidst all your tribes as His habitation, to establish His name there. There you are to go, and there you are to bring your burnt offerings and other sacrifices, . . . your votive and freewill offerings (נִדְבֹתֵיכֶם, nidvoteichem)." But in Amos 4:4–5, the 8th century BCE prophet Amos condemned the sins of the people of Israel, saying that they, "come to Bethel and transgress; to Gilgal, and transgress even more: . . . burn a thank offering of leavened bread; and proclaim freewill offerings (נְדָבוֹת, nedavot) loudly. For you love that sort of thing, O Israelites—declares my Lord God."

=== Deuteronomy chapter 14 ===
The food laws of Deuteronomy 14:3–21 come after those in Genesis 1:29, Genesis 9:3–4, and Leviticus 11. And the Hebrew Bible refers to clean and unclean animals in Genesis 7:2–9, Judges 13:4, and Ezekiel 4:14.

The Torah prohibits boiling a kid in its mother's milk in three separate places (Exodus 23:19 and 34:26 and Deuteronomy 14:21).

The Torah addresses tithes in Leviticus 27:30–33, Numbers 18:21–24, and Deuteronomy 14:22–29 and 26:12–14.

=== Deuteronomy chapter 16 ===
The Torah discusses annual festivals at Exodus 23:14–17; 34:18–24; Leviticus 23:4–44; Numbers 28–29; and Deuteronomy 16:1–17.

==== Passover ====
Deuteronomy 16:1–8 refers to the festival of Passover. In the Hebrew Bible, Passover is called:

- "Passover" (Pesach, פֶּסַח),
- "The Feast of Unleavened Bread" (Chag haMatzot, חַג הַמַּצּוֹת), and
- "A holy convocation" or "a solemn assembly" (mikrah kodesh, מִקְרָא-קֹדֶשׁ).

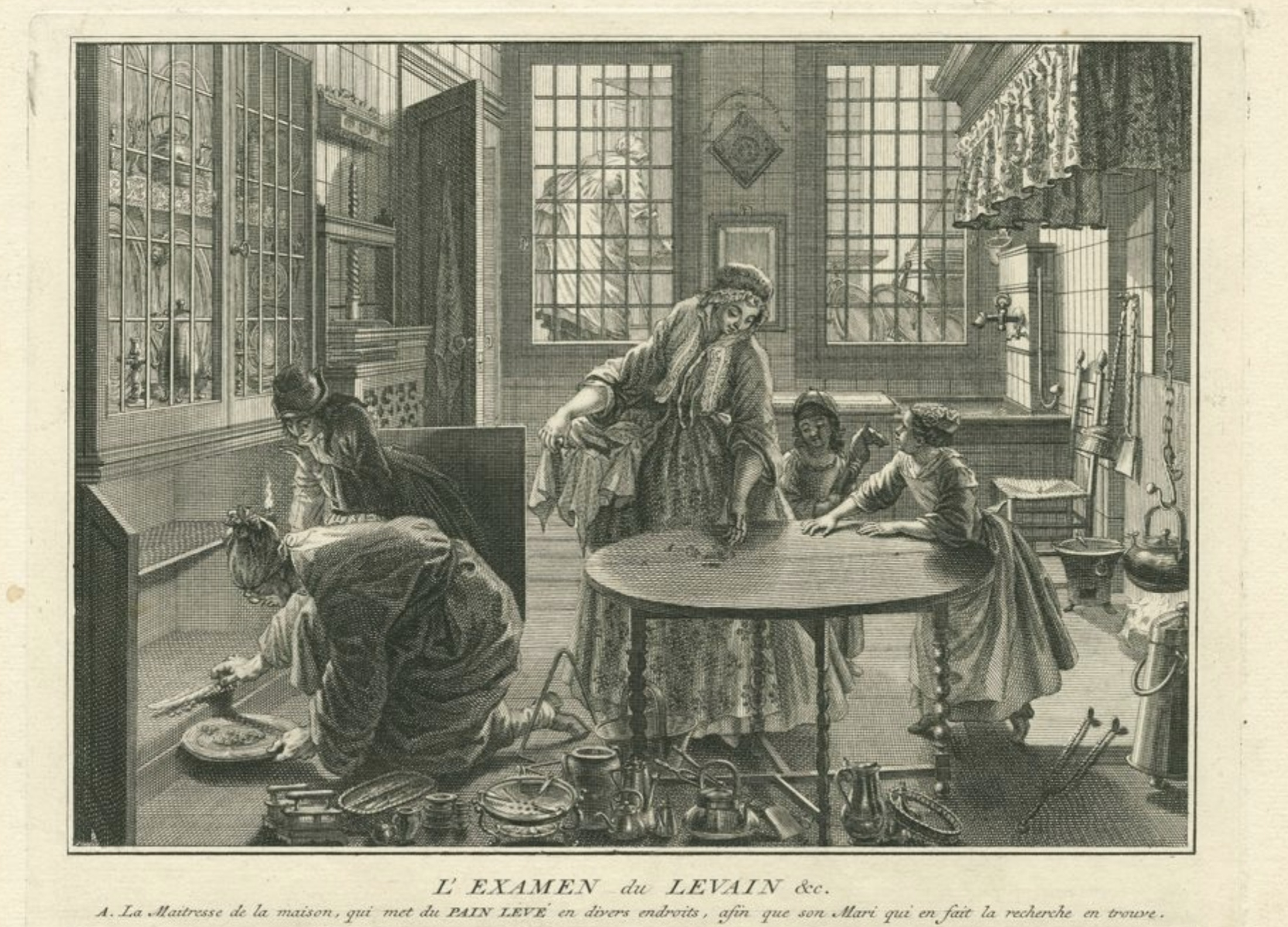
The Search for Leaven (illustration circa 1733–1739 by Bernard Picart)

Some explain the double nomenclature of "Passover" and "Feast of Unleavened Bread" as referring to two separate feasts that the Israelites combined sometime between the Exodus and when the Biblical text became settled. Exodus 34:18–20 and Deuteronomy 15:19–16:8 indicate that the dedication of the firstborn also became associated with the festival.

Some believe that the "Feast of Unleavened Bread" was an agricultural festival at which the Israelites celebrated the beginning of the grain harvest. Moses may have had this festival in mind when in Exodus 5:1 and 10:9 he petitioned Pharaoh to let the Israelites go to celebrate a feast in the wilderness.

"Passover," on the other hand, was associated with a thanksgiving sacrifice of a lamb, also called "the Passover," "the Passover lamb," or "the Passover offering."

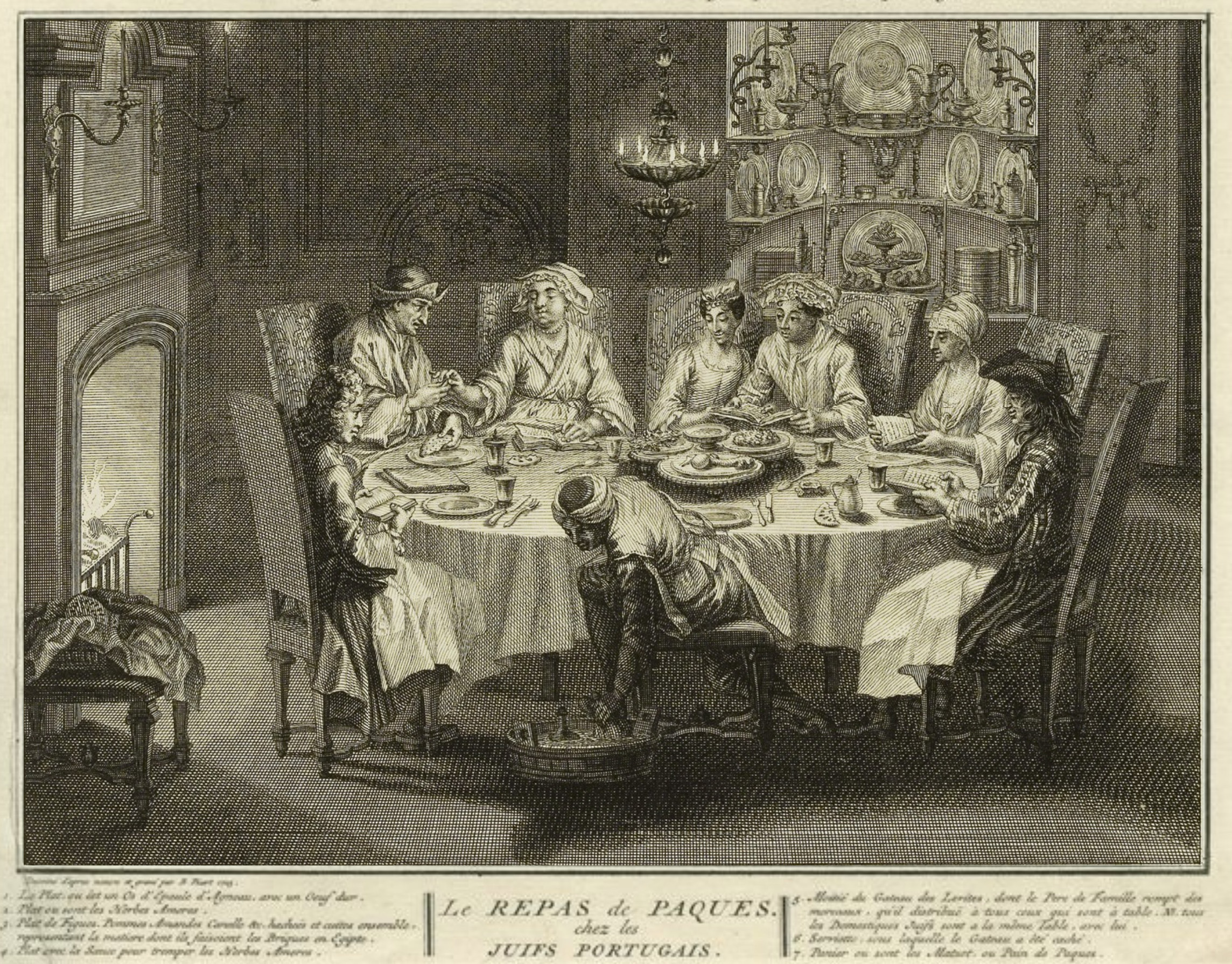
The Passover Seder of the Portuguese Jews (illustration circa 1733–1739 by Bernard Picart)

Exodus 12:5–6, Leviticus 23:5, and Numbers 9:3 and 5, and 28:16 direct "Passover" to take place on the evening of the fourteenth of Aviv (Nisan in the Hebrew calendar after the Babylonian captivity). Joshua 5:10, Ezekiel 45:21, Ezra 6:19, and 2 Chronicles 35:1 confirm that practice. Exodus 12:18–19, 23:15, and 34:18, Leviticus 23:6, and Ezekiel 45:21 direct the "Feast of Unleavened Bread" to take place over seven days and Leviticus 23:6 and Ezekiel 45:21 direct that it begin on the fifteenth of the month. Some believe that the propinquity of the dates of the two festivals led to their confusion and merger.

Sommer saw in Exodus 12:9 and Deuteronomy 16:7 a case in which one Biblical author explicitly interpreted another Biblical text. Both texts provide regulations concerning the Passover sacrifice, but the regulations differ. Deuteronomy 16:7 instructed the Israelites to boil the Passover sacrifice. Sommer argued that Exodus 12:9 takes issue with Deuteronomy 16:7 on this point, however, warning (in Sommer's translation), "Don’t eat it raw or boiled in water; rather, [eat it] roasted in fire." Sommer did not find such a disagreement in this ancient Jewish literature surprising, arguing that two groups in the Biblical period agreed that the Passover sacrifice was important but disagreed on its precise details.

Exodus 12:23 and 27 link the word "Passover" (Pesach, פֶּסַח) to God's act to "pass over" (pasach, פָסַח) the Israelites' houses in the plague of the firstborn. In the Torah, the consolidated Passover and Feast of Unleavened Bread thus commemorate the Israelites' liberation from Egypt.

The Hebrew Bible frequently notes the Israelites' observance of Passover at turning points in their history. Numbers 9:1–5 reports God's direction to the Israelites to observe Passover in the wilderness of Sinai on the anniversary of their liberation from Egypt. Joshua 5:10–11 reports that upon entering the Promised Land, the Israelites kept the Passover on the plains of Jericho and ate unleavened cakes and parched corn, produce of the land, the next day. 2 Kings 23:21–23 reports that King Josiah commanded the Israelites to keep the Passover in Jerusalem as part of Josiah's reforms, but also notes that the Israelites had not kept such a Passover from the days of the Biblical judges nor in all the days of the kings of Israel or the kings of Judah, calling into question the observance of even Kings David and Solomon. The more reverent 2 Chronicles 8:12–13, however, reports that Solomon offered sacrifices on the festivals, including the Feast of Unleavened Bread. And 2 Chronicles 30:1–27 reports King Hezekiah's observance of a second Passover anew, as sufficient numbers of neither the priests nor the people were prepared to do so before then. And Ezra 6:19–22 reports that the Israelites returned from the Babylonian captivity observed Passover, ate the Passover lamb, and kept the Feast of Unleavened Bread seven days with joy.

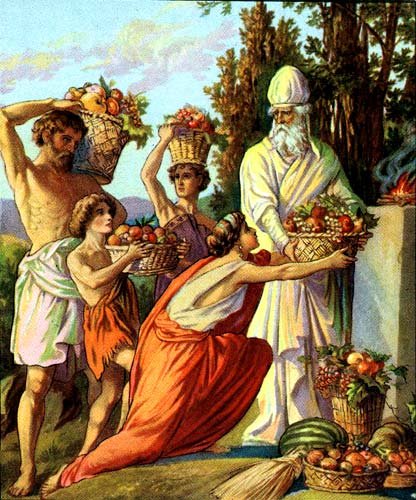
offering of firstfruits (illustration from a Bible card published between 1896 and 1913 by the Providence Lithograph Company)

==== Shavuot ====
Deuteronomy 16:10 refers to the festival of Shavuot. In the Hebrew Bible, Shavuot is called:

- The Feast of Weeks (חַג שָׁבֻעֹת, Chag Shavuot),
- The Day of the First-fruits (יוֹם הַבִּכּוּרִים, Yom haBikurim),
- The Feast of Harvest (חַג הַקָּצִיר, Chag haKatzir), and
- A holy convocation (מִקְרָא-קֹדֶשׁ, mikrah kodesh).

Exodus 34:22 associates Shavuot with the first-fruits of the wheat harvest. In turn, Deuteronomy 26:1–11 set out the ceremony for the bringing of the firstfruits.

To arrive at the correct date, Leviticus 23:15 instructs counting seven weeks from the day after the day of rest of Passover, the day that they brought the sheaf of barley for waving. Similarly, Deuteronomy 16:9 directs counting seven weeks from when they first put the sickle to the standing barley.

Leviticus 23:16–19 sets out a course of offerings for the fiftieth day, including a meal-offering of two loaves made from fine flour from the firstfruits of the harvest; burnt-offerings of seven lambs, one bullock, and two rams; a sin-offering of a goat; and a peace-offering of two lambs. Similarly, Numbers 28:26–30 sets out a course of offerings including a meal-offering; burnt-offerings of two bullocks, one ram, and seven lambs; and one goat to make atonement. Deuteronomy 16:10 directs a freewill-offering in relation to God's blessing.

Leviticus 23:21 and Numbers 28:26 ordain a holy convocation in which the Israelites were not to work.

2 Chronicles 8:13 reports that Solomon offered burnt-offerings on the Feast of Weeks.

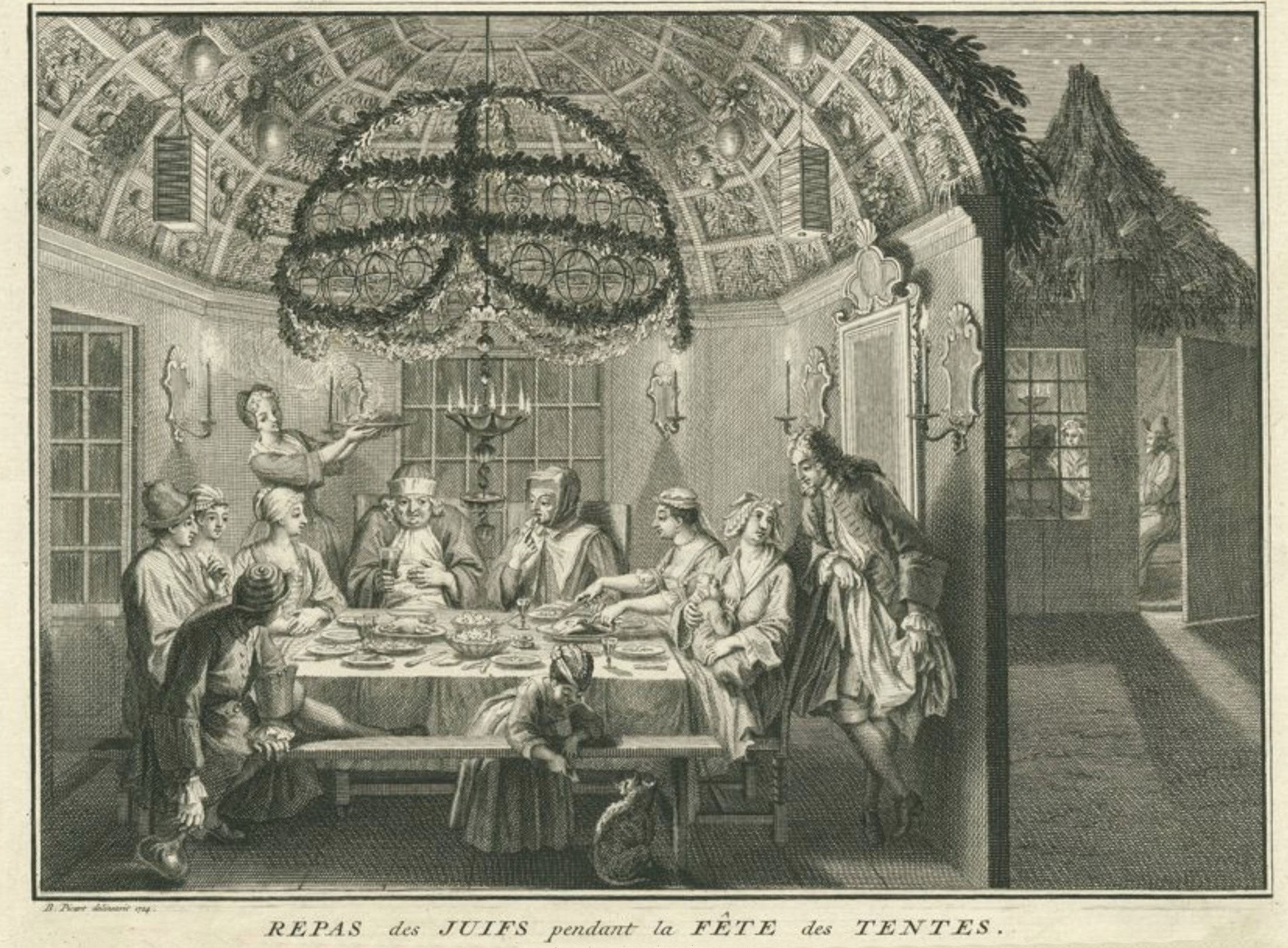
Family feast in a Sukkah with foliage canopy and chandelier (engraving by Bernard Picart, 1724)

==== Sukkot ====
And Deuteronomy 16:13–15 refers to the festival of Sukkot. In the Hebrew Bible, Sukkot is called:

- "The Feast of Tabernacles (or Booths),"
- "The Feast of Ingathering,"
- "The Feast" or "the festival,"
- "The Feast of the Lord,"
- "The festival of the seventh month," and
- "A holy convocation" or "a sacred occasion."

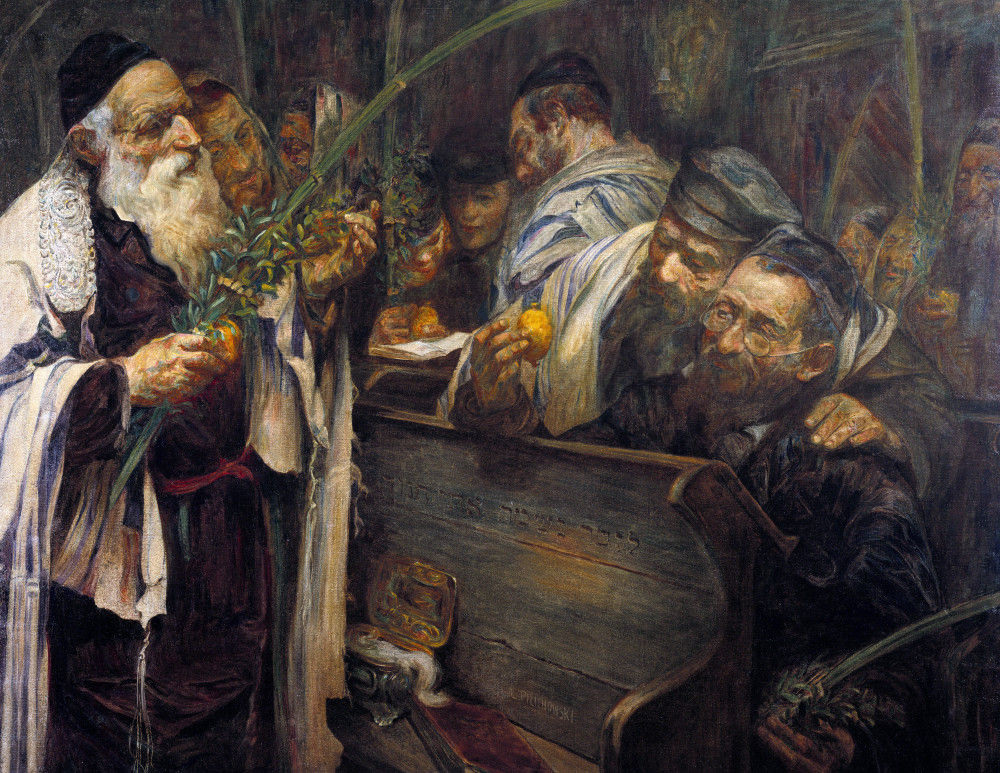
Celebrating Sukkot with the Four Species (painting circa 1894–1895 by Leopold Pilichowski)

Sukkot's agricultural origin is evident from the name "The Feast of Ingathering," from the ceremonies accompanying it, and from the season and occasion of its celebration: "At the end of the year when you gather in your labors out of the field"; "after you have gathered in from your threshing-floor and from your winepress." It was a thanksgiving for the fruit harvest. And in what may explain the festival's name, Isaiah reports that grape harvesters kept booths in their vineyards. Coming as it did at the completion of the harvest, Sukkot was regarded as a general thanksgiving for the bounty of nature in the year that had passed.

Sukkot became one of the most important feasts in Judaism, as indicated by its designation as "the Feast of the Lord" or simply "the Feast." Perhaps because of its wide attendance, Sukkot became the appropriate time for important state ceremonies. Moses instructed the children of Israel to gather for a reading of the Law during Sukkot every seventh year. King Solomon dedicated the Temple in Jerusalem on Sukkot. And Sukkot was the first sacred occasion observed after the resumption of sacrifices in Jerusalem after the Babylonian captivity.

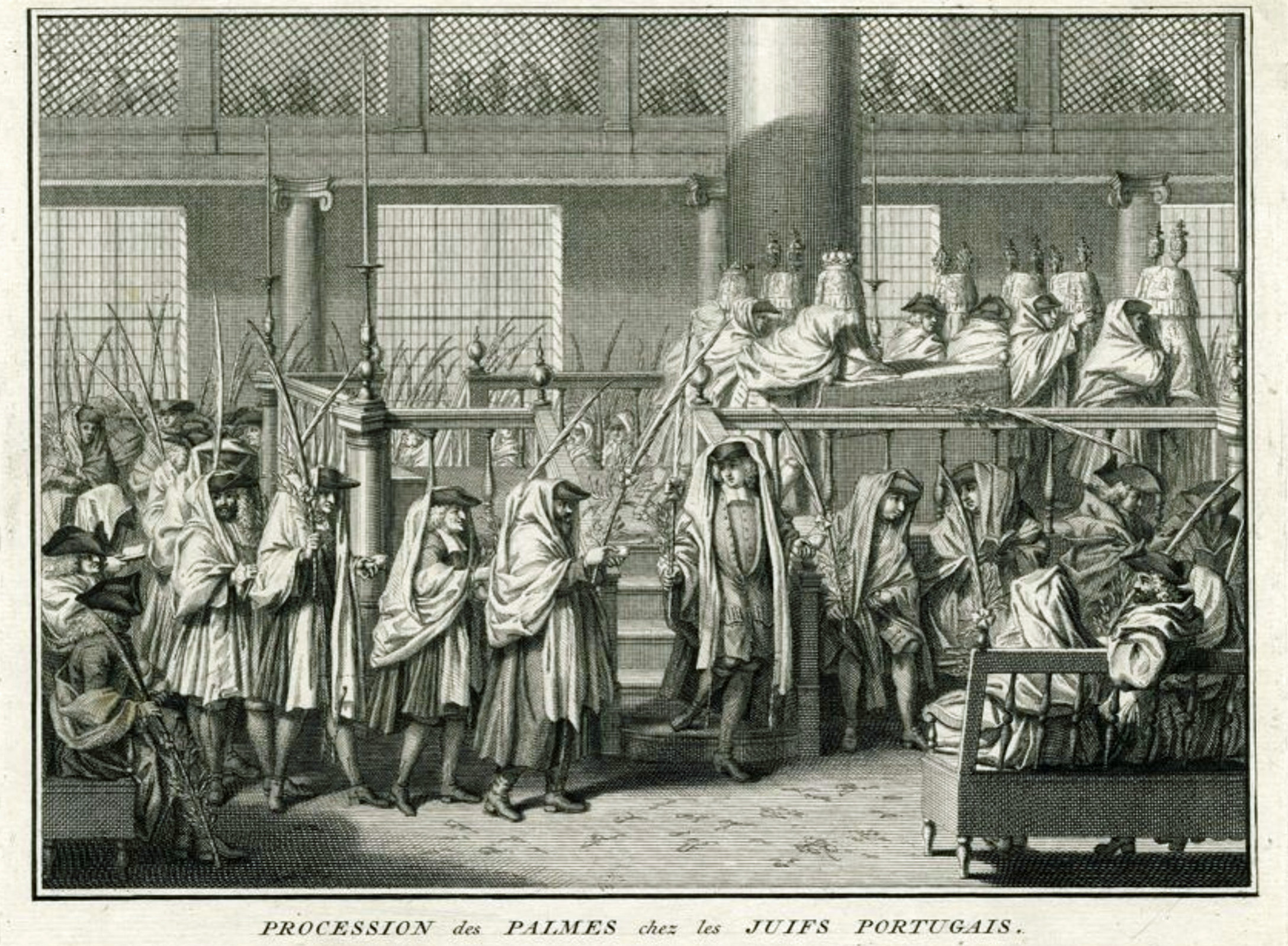
Sephardic Jews Observe Hoshanah Rabbah (engraving circa 1723–1743 by Bernard Picart)

In the time of Nehemiah, after the Babylonian captivity, the Israelites celebrated Sukkot by making and dwelling in booths, a practice of which Nehemiah reports: "the Israelites had not done so from the days of Joshua." In a practice related to that of the Four Species, Nehemiah also reports that the Israelites found in the Law the commandment that they "go out to the mountains and bring leafy branches of olive trees, pine trees, myrtles, palms and [other] leafy trees to make booths." In Leviticus 23:40, God told Moses to command the people: "On the first day you shall take the product of hadar trees, branches of palm trees, boughs of leafy trees, and willows of the brook," and "You shall live in booths seven days; all citizens in Israel shall live in booths, in order that future generations may know that I made the Israelite people live in booths when I brought them out of the land of Egypt." The book of Numbers, however, indicates that while in the wilderness, the Israelites dwelt in tents. Some secular scholars consider Leviticus 23:39–43 (the commandments regarding booths and the four species) to be an insertion by a late redactor.

Jeroboam son of Nebat, King of the northern Kingdom of Israel, whom 1 Kings 13:33 describes as practicing "his evil way," celebrated a festival on the fifteenth day of the eighth month, one month after Sukkot, "in imitation of the festival in Judah." "While Jeroboam was standing on the altar to present the offering, the man of God, at the command of the Lord, cried out against the altar" in disapproval.

According to the prophet Zechariah, in the messianic era, Sukkot will become a universal festival, and all nations will make pilgrimages annually to Jerusalem to celebrate the feast there.

== In early nonrabbinic interpretation ==
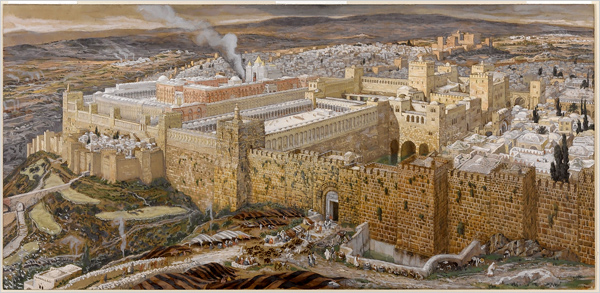
Jerusalem and the Temple (1894 watercolor by James Tissot)

The parashah has parallels or is discussed in these early nonrabbinic sources:

=== Deuteronomy chapter 12 ===
Josephus interpreted the centralization of worship in Deuteronomy 12:1–19 to teach that just as there is only one God, there would be only one Temple; and the Temple was to be common to all people, just as God is the God for all people.

=== Deuteronomy chapter 14 ===
Isaiah Gafni noted that in the Book of Tobit, the protagonist Tobit observed the dietary laws.

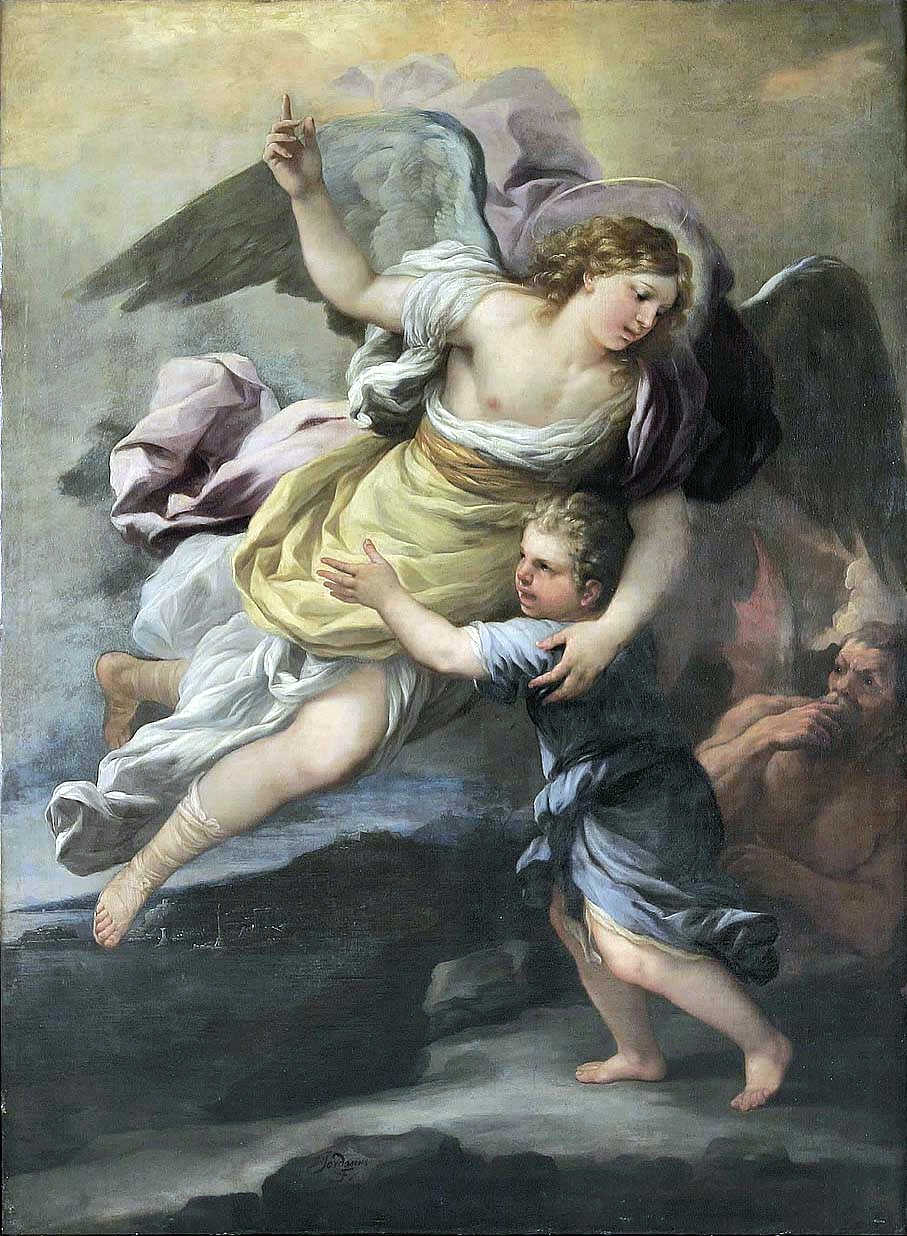
A Guardian Angel (18th Century painting)

== In classical rabbinic interpretation ==
The parashah is discussed in these rabbinic sources from the era of the Mishnah and the Talmud:

=== Deuteronomy chapter 11 ===
The Rabbis taught that the words of Deuteronomy 11:26, "Behold, I set before you this day a blessing and a curse," demonstrate that God did not set before the Israelites the Blessings and the Curses of Leviticus 26 and Deuteronomy 28 to hurt them, but only to show them the good way that they should choose in order to receive reward. Rabbi Levi compared the proposition of Deuteronomy 11:26 to a master who offered his servant a golden necklace if the servant would do the master's will, or iron chains if the servant did not. Rabbi Haggai taught that not only had God in Deuteronomy 11:26 set two paths before the Israelites, but God did not administer justice to them according to the strict letter of the law, but allowed them mercy so that they might (in the words of Deuteronomy 30:19) "choose life." And Rabbi Joshua ben Levi taught that when a person makes the choice that Deuteronomy 11:26–27 urges and observes the words of the Torah, a procession of angels passes before the person to guard the person from evil, bringing into effect the promised blessing.

The Sifre explained that Deuteronomy 11:26–28 explicitly says, "I set before you this day a blessing and a curse: the blessing, if you obey the commandments . . . and the curse, if you shall not obey the commandments," because otherwise the Israelites might read Deuteronomy 30:19, "I have set before you life and death, the blessing and the curse," and think that since God set before them both paths, they could go whichever way they chose. Thus, Deuteronomy 30:19 directs explicitly: "choose life."

The Sifre compared Deuteronomy 11:26–30 to a person sitting at a crossroads with two paths ahead. One of the paths began with clear ground but ended in thorns. The other began with thorns but ended in clear ground. The person would tell passersby that the path that appeared clear would be fine for two or three steps, but end in thorns, and the path that began with thorns would be difficult for two or three steps, but end in clear ground. So, said the Sifre, Moses told Israel that one might see the wicked flourish in this world for a short time, but in the end, they will have occasion to regret. And the righteous who are distressed in this world will in the end have occasion for rejoicing, as Deuteronomy 8:16 says, "that He might prove you, to do you good at the end."

The Mishnah described how the ceremony of the blessings and curses mentioned in Deuteronomy 11:29 took place.

The rabbis asked in a baraita why Deuteronomy 11:29 says, "You shall set the blessing upon Mount Gerizim and the curse upon mount Ebal." The rabbis presumed that Deuteronomy 11:29 could not say so merely to teach where the Israelites were to say the blessings and curses, as Deuteronomy 27:12–13 already says, "These shall stand upon Mount Gerizim to bless the people . . . and these shall stand upon Mount Ebal for the curse." Rather, the Rabbis taught that the purpose of Deuteronomy 11:29 was to indicate that the blessings were to precede the curses. The rabbis rejected the thought that all the blessings would precede all the curses; thus, the text states "blessing" and "curse" in the singular, teaching that one blessing preceded one curse, alternating blessings and curses. As the curses were pronounced by the Levites, so the blessing had to be pronounced by the Levites. As the curse was uttered in a loud voice, so the blessing had to be uttered in a loud voice. As the curse was said in Hebrew, so the blessing had to be said in Hebrew. As the curses were in general and particular terms, so the blessings had to be in general and particular terms. And as with the curse both parties responded "Amen," so with the blessing both parties responded "Amen."

The Mishnah noted the common mention of the terebinths of Moreh in both Deuteronomy 11:30 and Genesis 12:6 and deduced that Gerizim and Ebal were near Shechem. But Rabbi Judah deduced from the words "beyond the Jordan" in Deuteronomy 11:30 that Gerizim and Ebal were some distance beyond the Jordan. Rabbi Judah deduced from the words "behind the way of the going down of the sun" in Deuteronomy 11:30 that Gerizim and Ebal were far from the east, where the sun rises. And Rabbi Judah also deduced from the words "over against Gilgal" in Deuteronomy 11:30 that Gerizim and Ebal were close to Gilgal. Rabbi Eleazar ben Jose said, however, that the words "Are they not beyond the Jordan" in Deuteronomy 11:30 indicated that Gerizim and Ebal were near the Jordan.

The Tosefta read Deuteronomy 11:30 to report that the Israelites miraculously traveled more than 60 mils, crossing the Jordan River and going all the way to Mount Gerizim and Mount Ebal, all in a single day.

Rabbi Hananiah ben Iddi read Deuteronomy 11:31 to report Moses bewailing for himself—"you are to pass over the Jordan," but I am not.

=== Deuteronomy chapter 12 ===
The Rabbis interpreted the words of Deuteronomy 12:1, "These are the statutes and the ordinances, which you shall observe to do in the land . . . all the days that you live upon the earth," in a baraita. They read "the statutes" to refer to the Rabbinic interpretations of the text. They read "the ordinances" to refer to monetary, civil laws. They read "which you shall observe" to refer study. They read "to do" to refer to actual practice. Reading "in the land," one might think that all precepts are binding only in the Land of Israel; therefore Deuteronomy 12:1 states, "all the days that you live upon the earth" to teach that the laws bind one wherever one lives. Reading "all the days," one might think that all precepts are binding both inside and outside the Land of Israel; therefore Deuteronomy 12:1 states, "in the land." The Rabbis taught that one could thus learn from the next verse, "You shall utterly destroy all the places, wherein the nations served their God," that just as the destruction of idolatry is a personal duty and is binding both inside and outside the Land of Israel, so everything that is a personal duty is binding both inside and outside the Land of Israel. And conversely, laws that are connected to the land are binding only in the Land of Israel.

Rabbi Jose son of Rabbi Judah derived from the use of the two instances of the verb "destroy" in the Hebrew for "you shall surely destroy" in Deuteronomy 12:2 that the Israelites were to destroy the Canaanite's idols twice, and the Rabbis explained that this meant by cutting them and then by uprooting them from the ground. The Gemara explained that Rabbi Jose derived from the words "and you shall destroy their name out of that place" in Deuteronomy 12:3 that the place of the idol must be renamed. And Rabbi Eliezer deduced from the same words in Deuteronomy 12:3 that the Israelites were to eradicate every trace of the idol.

Reading "terumah" in Deuteronomy 12:6, 11, and 17, the Mishnah noted that Scripture calls both terumah and firstfruits "the first" and asked which offerors should bring first. The Mishnah concluded that firstfruits take precedence, as they are the first fruits of all produce, and terumah comes before the first tithe because Scripture calls it "first."

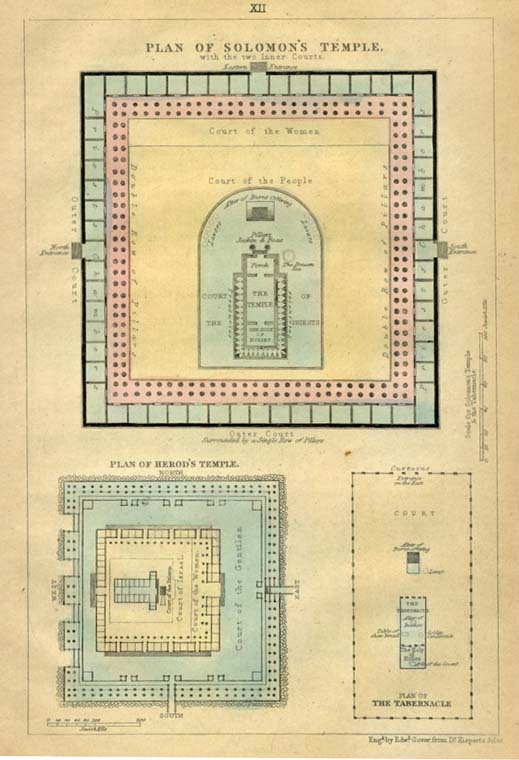
Plan of the Tabernacle, Solomon's Temple, and Herod's Temple

The Mishnah recounted the history of decentralized sacrifice. Before the Tabernacle, high places were permitted, and Israelite firstborn performed the sacrifices. After the Israelites set up the Tabernacle, high places were forbidden, and priests performed the services. When the Israelites entered the Promised Land and came to Gilgal, high places were again permitted. When the Israelites came to Shiloh, high places were again forbidden. The Tabernacle there had no roof, but consisted of a stone structure covered with cloth. The Mishnah interpreted the Tabernacle at Shiloh to be the "rest" to which Moses referred in Deuteronomy 12:9. When the Israelites came to Nob and Gibeon, high places were again permitted. And when the Israelites came to Jerusalem, high places were forbidden and never again permitted. The Mishnah interpreted the sanctuary in Jerusalem to be "the inheritance" to which Moses referred in Deuteronomy 12:9. The Mishnah explained the different practices at the various high places when high places were permitted. The Mishnah taught that there was no difference between a Great Altar (at the Tabernacle or the Temple) and a small altar (a local high place), except that the Israelites had to bring obligatory sacrifices that had a fixed time, like the Passover sacrifice, to the Great Altar. Further, the Mishnah explained that there was no difference between Shiloh and Jerusalem except that in Shiloh they ate minor sacrifices and second tithes (ma'aser sheni) anywhere within sight of Shiloh, whereas at Jerusalem they were eaten within the wall. And the sanctity of Shiloh was followed by a period when high places were permitted, while after the sanctity of Jerusalem high places were no longer permitted.

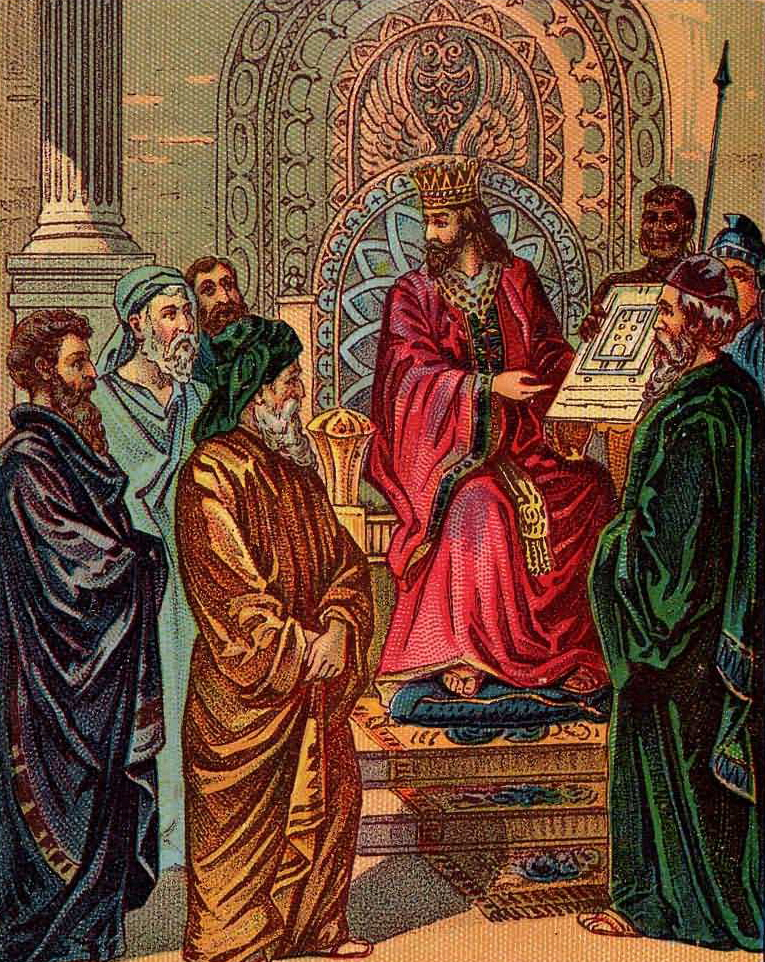
King Solomon and the Plan for the Temple (illustration from a Bible card published 1896 by the Providence Lithograph Company)

Rabbi Judah (or some say Rabbi Jose) said that three commandments were given to the Israelites when they entered the land: (1) the commandment of Deuteronomy 17:14–15 to appoint a king, (2) the commandment of Deuteronomy 25:19 to blot out Amalek, and (3) the commandment of Deuteronomy 12:10–11 to build the Temple in Jerusalem. Rabbi Nehorai, on the other hand, said that Deuteronomy 17:14–15 did not command the Israelites to choose a king, but was spoken only in anticipation of the Israelites' future complaints, as Deuteronomy 17:14 says, "And (you) shall say, ‘I will set a king over me.'" A baraita taught that because Deuteronomy 12:10–11 says, "And when He gives you rest from all your enemies round about," and then proceeds, "then it shall come to pass that the place that the Lord your God shall choose," it implies that the commandment to exterminate Amalek was to come before building of the Temple.

Tractate Bikkurim in the Mishnah, Tosefta, and Jerusalem Talmud interpreted the laws of the firstfruits in Exodus 23:19 and 34:26, Numbers 18:13, and Deuteronomy 12:17–18, 18:4, and 26:1–11.

The Mishnah taught that the Torah set no amount for the firstfruits that the Israelites had to bring.

=== Deuteronomy chapter 13 ===
The Sifre derived from the command of Deuteronomy 13:1, "All this word that I command you, that shall you observe to do; you shall not add thereto, nor diminish from it," that a minor religious duty should be as precious as a principal duty.

The Jerusalem Talmud interpreted Deuteronomy 13:2—"a prophet . . . gives you a sign or a wonder"—to demonstrate that a prophet's authority depends on the prophet's producing a sign or wonder.

How could a prophet of other gods perform a sign or wonder that actually came to pass? Rabbi Akiva explained that Deuteronomy 13:2–3 refers only to those who began as true prophets, but then turned into false prophets.

Deuteronomy 13:2–6 addresses a "dream-diviner" who seeks to lead the Israelites astray. The Gemara taught that a dream is a sixtieth part of prophecy. Rabbi Hanan taught that even if the Master of Dreams (an angel, in a dream that truly foretells the future) tells a person that on the next day the person will die, the person should not desist from prayer, for as Ecclesiastes 5:6 says, "For in the multitude of dreams are vanities and also many words, but fear God." (Although a dream may seem reliably to predict the future, it will not necessarily come true; one must place one's trust in God.) Rabbi Samuel bar Nahmani said in the name of Rabbi Jonathan that a person is shown in a dream only what is suggested by the person's own thoughts (while awake), as Daniel 2:29 says, "As for you, Oh King, your thoughts came into your mind upon your bed," and Daniel 2:30 says, "That you may know the thoughts of the heart." When Samuel had a bad dream, he used to quote Zechariah 10:2, "The dreams speak falsely." When he had a good dream, he used to question whether dreams speak falsely, seeing as in Numbers 10:2, God says, "I speak with him in a dream?" Rava pointed out the potential contradiction between Numbers 10:2 and Zechariah 10:2. The Gemara resolved the contradiction, teaching that Numbers 10:2, "I speak with him in a dream?" refers to dreams that come through an angel, whereas Zechariah 10:2, "The dreams speak falsely," refers to dreams that come through a demon.

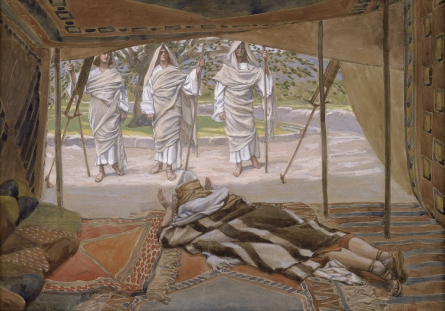
Abraham and the Three Angels (watercolor circa 1896–1902 by James Tissot)

Rabbi Hama son of Rabbi Hanina asked what Deuteronomy 13:5 means in the text, "You shall walk after the Lord your God." How can a human being walk after God, when Deuteronomy 4:24 says, "[T]he Lord your God is a devouring fire"? Rabbi Hama son of Rabbi Hanina explained that the command to walk after God means to walk after the attributes of God. As God clothes the naked—for Genesis 3:21 says, "And the Lord God made for Adam and for his wife coats of skin, and clothed them"—so should we also clothe the naked. God visited the sick—for Genesis 18:1 says, "And the Lord appeared to him by the oaks of Mamre" (after Abraham was circumcised in Genesis 17:26)—so should we also visit the sick. God comforted mourners—for Genesis 25:11 says, "And it came to pass after the death of Abraham, that God blessed Isaac his son"—so should we also comfort mourners. God buried the dead—for Deuteronomy 34:6 says, "And He buried him in the valley"—so should we also bury the dead. Similarly, the Sifre on Deuteronomy 11:22 taught that to walk in God's ways means to be (in the words of Exodus 34:6) "merciful and gracious."

Rabbi Elazar noted that both Deuteronomy 13:14 and 1 Samuel 1:16 use the expression "child of Belial" ("sons of Belial," בְּנֵי-בְלִיַּעַל, benei beliya'al in Deuteronomy 13:14; "daughter of Belial," בַּת-בְּלִיָּעַל, bat beliya'al in 1 Samuel 1:16). Rabbi Elazar reasoned from the common use of the term "child of Belial" that the context was the same in both verses. As Deuteronomy 13:14 addresses a city engaged in idol worship, and in 1 Samuel 1:16, Hannah denied praying while drunk, Rabbi Elazar argued that the verbal analogy supports the proposition that when a drunk person prays, it is as if that person engaged in idol worship.

The Mishnah taught that a court would examine witnesses in capital cases with seven questions: (1) In which cycle of seven years within a jubilee did the event occur? (2) In which year of the Sabbatical cycle did the event occur? (3) In which month did the event occur? (4) On which day of the month did the event occur? (5) On which day of the week did the event occur? (6) At which hour did the event occur? And (7) in what place did the event occur? Rabbi Yosei said that the court would examine the witnesses with only three questions: On which day did the event occur, at which hour, and in what place? In the Gemara, Rav Judah taught that the sources for these seven interrogations were the three verses Deuteronomy 13:15, “And you shall inquire, and investigate, and ask diligently”; Deuteronomy 17:4, “If it be told to you and you have heard it and inquired diligently”; and Deuteronomy 19:18, “And the judges shall inquire diligently.”

The Gemara taught that Deuteronomy 13:18 sets forth one of the three most distinguishing virtues of the Jewish People. The Gemara taught that David told the Gibeonites that the Israelites are distinguished by three characteristics: They are merciful, bashful, and benevolent. They are merciful, for Deuteronomy 13:18 says that God would "show you [the Israelites] mercy, and have compassion upon you, and multiply you." They are bashful, for Exodus 20:17 says "that God's fear may be before you [the Israelites]." And they are benevolent, for Genesis 18:19 says of Abraham "that he may command his children and his household after him, that they may keep the way of the Lord, to do righteousness and justice." The Gemara taught that David told the Gibeonites that only one who cultivates these three characteristics is fit to join the Jewish People.

Mishnah Sanhedrin 10:4–6, Tosefta Sanhedrin 14:1–6, and Babylonian Talmud Sanhedrin 111b–13b interpreted Deuteronomy 13:13–19 to address the law of the apostate town (Ir nidachat). The Mishnah held that only a court of 71 judges could declare such a city, and the court could not declare cities on the frontier or three cities within one locale to be apostate cities. A baraita taught that there never was an apostate town and never will be. Rabbi Eliezer said that no city containing even a single mezuzah could be condemned as an apostate town, as Deuteronomy 13:17 instructs with regard to such a town, "you shall gather all the spoil of it in the midst of the street thereof and shall burn . . . all the spoil," but if the spoil contains even a single mezuzah, this burning would be forbidden by the injunction of Deuteronomy 12:3–4, which states, "you shall destroy the names of [the idols] . . . . You shall not do so to the Lord your God," and thus forbids destroying the Name of God. Rabbi Jonathan, however, said that he saw an apostate town and sat upon its ruins.

=== Deuteronomy chapter 14 ===
Tractate Chullin in the Mishnah, Tosefta, and Babylonian Talmud interpreted the laws of kashrut in Leviticus 11 and Deuteronomy 14:3–21.

Providing an exception to the laws of kashrut in Leviticus 11 and Deuteronomy 14:3–21, Rabin said in Rabbi Johanan's name that one may cure oneself with all forbidden things, except idolatry, incest, and murder.

A midrash taught that Adam offered an ox as a sacrifice, anticipating the laws of clean animals in Leviticus 11:1–8 and Deuteronomy 14:4–6.

Rav Chisda asked how Noah knew (before the giving of Leviticus 11 or Deuteronomy 14:3–21) which animals were clean and which were unclean. Rav Chisda explained that Noah led them past the Ark, and those that the Ark accepted (in multiples of seven) were certainly clean, and those that the Ark rejected were certainly unclean. Rabbi Abbahu cited Genesis 7:16, "And they that went in, went in male and female," to show that they went in of their own accord (in their respective pairs, seven of the clean and two of the unclean).

Rabbi Tanhum ben Hanilai compared the laws of kashrut to the case of a physician who went to visit two patients, one whom the physician judged would live, and the other whom the physician judged would die. To the one who would live, the physician gave orders about what to eat and what not to eat. On the other hand, the physician told the one who would die to eat whatever the patient wanted. Thus to the nations who were not destined for life in the World to Come, God said in Genesis 9:3, "Every moving thing that lives shall be food for you." But to Israel, whom God intended for life in the World to Come, God said in Leviticus 11:2, "These are the living things which you may eat."

Rav reasoned that since Proverbs 30:5 teaches that "Every word of God is pure," then the precepts of kashrut were given for the express purpose of purifying humanity.

Reading Leviticus 18:4, "My ordinances (מִשְׁפָּטַי, mishpatai) shall you do, and My statutes (חֻקֹּתַי, chukotai) shall you keep," the Sifra distinguished "ordinances" (מִשְׁפָּטִים, mishpatim) from "statutes" (חֻקִּים, chukim). The term "ordinances" (מִשְׁפָּטִים, mishpatim), taught the Sifra, refers to rules that even had they not been written in the Torah, it would have been entirely logical to write them, like laws pertaining to theft, sexual immorality, idolatry, blasphemy and murder. The term "statutes" (חֻקִּים, chukim), taught the Sifra, refers to those rules that the impulse to do evil (יצר הרע, yetzer hara) and the nations of the world try to undermine, like eating pork (prohibited by Leviticus 11:7 and Deuteronomy 14:7–8), wearing wool-linen mixtures (שַׁעַטְנֵז, shatnez, prohibited by Leviticus 19:19 and Deuteronomy 22:11), release from levirate marriage (חליצה, chalitzah, mandated by Deuteronomy 25:5–10), purification of a person affected by skin disease (מְּצֹרָע, metzora, regulated in Leviticus 13–14), and the goat sent off into the wilderness (the "scapegoat," regulated in Leviticus 16). In regard to these, taught the Sifra, the Torah says simply that God legislated them and we have no right to raise doubts about them.

Interpreting Leviticus 11:3 and Deuteronomy 14:6, the Mishnah observed the general principle that any animal that has horns has hooves, but some animals have hooves but do not have horns.

Rabbi Eleazar ben Azariah taught that people should not say that they do not want to wear a wool-linen mixture (שַׁעַטְנֵז, shatnez, prohibited by Leviticus 19:19 and Deuteronomy 22:11), eat pork (prohibited by Leviticus 11:7 and Deuteronomy 14:7–8), or be intimate with forbidden partners (prohibited by Leviticus 18 and 20), but rather should say that they would love to, but God has decreed that they not do so. For in Leviticus 20:26, God says, "I have separated you from the nations to be mine." So one should separate from transgression and accept the rule of Heaven.

Rabbi Berekiah said in the name of Rabbi Isaac that in the Time to Come, God will make a banquet for God's righteous servants, and whoever had not eaten meat from an animal that died other than through ritual slaughtering (נְבֵלָה, nebeilah, prohibited by Leviticus 17:1–4) in this world will have the privilege of enjoying it in the World to Come. This is indicated by Leviticus 7:24, which says, "And the fat of that which dies of itself (נְבֵלָה, nebeilah) and the fat of that which is torn by beasts (טְרֵפָה, tereifah), may be used for any other service, but you shall not eat it," so that one might eat it in the Time to Come. (By one's present self-restraint one might merit to partake of the banquet in the Hereafter.) For this reason Moses admonished the Israelites in Leviticus 11:2, "This is the animal that you shall eat."

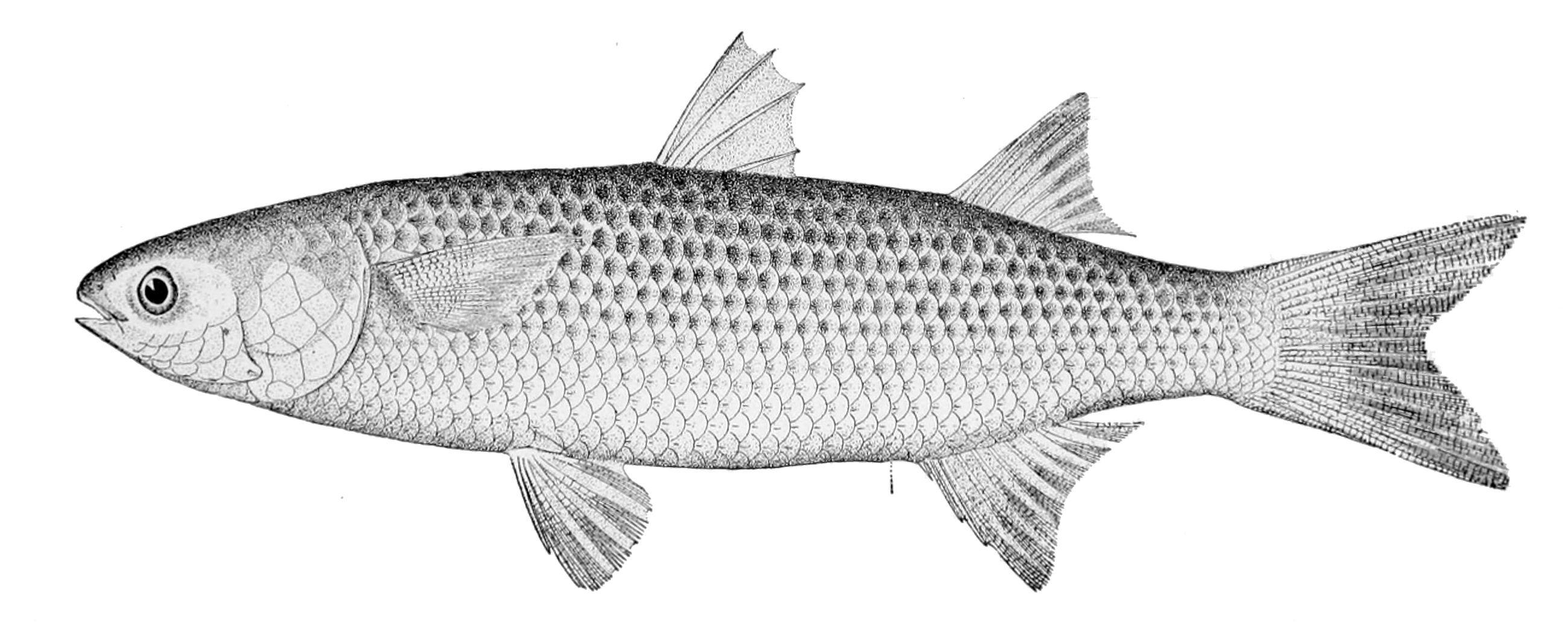
The Mullet (1887 illustration from The Fisheries and Fisheries Industries of the United States by George Brown Goode)

Interpreting Leviticus 11:9 and Deuteronomy 14:9–10, the Mishnah observed the general principle that any fish that has scales has fins, but some fish have fins but do not have scales.

A midrash interpreted Psalm 146:7, "The Lord lets loose the prisoners," to read, "The Lord permits the forbidden," and thus to teach that what God forbade in one case, God permitted in another. God forbade the abdominal fat of cattle (in Leviticus 3:3) but permitted it in the case of beasts. God forbade consuming the sciatic nerve in animals (in Genesis 32:33) but permitted it in fowl. God forbade eating meat without ritual slaughter (in Leviticus 17:1–4) but permitted it for fish. Similarly, Rabbi Abba and Rabbi Jonathan in the name of Rabbi Levi taught that God permitted more things than God forbade. For example, God counterbalanced the prohibition of pork (in Leviticus 11:7 and Deuteronomy 14:7–8) by permitting mullet (which some say tastes like pork).

The Mishnah noted that the Torah states (in Leviticus 11:3 and Deuteronomy 14:6) the characteristics of domestic and wild animals (by which one can tell whether they are clean). The Mishnah noted that the Torah does not similarly state the characteristics of birds, but the sages taught that every bird that seizes its prey is unclean. Every bird that has an extra toe (a hallux), a crop, and a gizzard that can be peeled off is clean. Rabbi Eliezer the son of Rabbi Zadok taught that every bird that parts its toes (evenly) is unclean. The Mishnah taught that among locusts, all that have four legs, four wings, jointed legs (as in Leviticus 11:21), and wings covering the greater part of the body are clean. Rabbi Jose taught that it must also bear the name "locust." The Mishnah taught that among fish, all that have fins and scales are clean. Rabbi Judah said that it must have (at least) two scales and one fin (to be clean). The scales are those (thin discs) that are attached to the fish, and the fins are those (wings) by which it swims.

The Mishnah taught that hunters of wild animals, birds, and fish, who chanced upon animals that Leviticus 11 defined as unclean were allowed to sell them. Rabbi Judah taught that a person who chanced upon such animals by accident was allowed to buy or sell them, provided that the person did not make a regular trade of it. But the sages did not allow it.

Rav Shaman bar Abba said in the name of Rav Idi bar Idi bar Gershom who said it in the name of Levi bar Perata who said it in the name of Rabbi Nahum who said it in the name of Rabbi Biraim who said it in the name of a certain old man named Rabbi Jacob that those of the Nasi's house taught that (cooking) a forbidden egg among 60 (permitted) eggs renders them all forbidden, (but cooking) a forbidden egg among 61 (permitted) eggs renders them all permitted. Rabbi Zera questioned the ruling, but the Gemara cited the definitive ruling: It was stated that Rabbi Helbo said in the name of Rav Huna that with regard to a (forbidden) egg (cooked with permitted ones), if there are 60 besides the (forbidden) one, they are (all) forbidden, but if there are 61 besides the (forbidden) one, they are permitted.

The Mishnah taught the general rule that wherever the flavor from a prohibited food yields benefit, it is prohibited, but wherever the flavor from a prohibited food does not yield benefit, it is permitted. For example, if (prohibited) vinegar fell into split beans (it is permitted).

Reading the injunction against eating pork in Deuteronomy 14:7–8, a midrash found signs of the duplicity of the Romans and their spiritual progenitor, Esau. Rabbi Phinehas (and other say Rabbi Helkiah) taught in Rabbi Simon's name that Moses and Asaph (author of Psalm 80) exposed the Romans' deception. Asaph said in Psalm 80:14: "The boar of the wood ravages it." While Moses said in Deuteronomy 14:7–8: "you shall not eat of . . . the swine, because he parts the hoof but does not chew the cud." The midrash explained that Scripture compares the Roman Empire to a swine, because when the swine lies down, it puts out its parted hoofs, as if to advertise that it is clean. And so the midrash taught that the wicked Roman Empire robbed and oppressed, yet pretended to execute justice. So the midrash taught that for 40 years, Esau would ensnare married women and violate them, yet when he reached the age of 40, he compared himself to his righteous father Isaac, telling himself that as his father Isaac was 40 years old when he married (as reported in Genesis 25:19), so he too would marry at the age of 40.

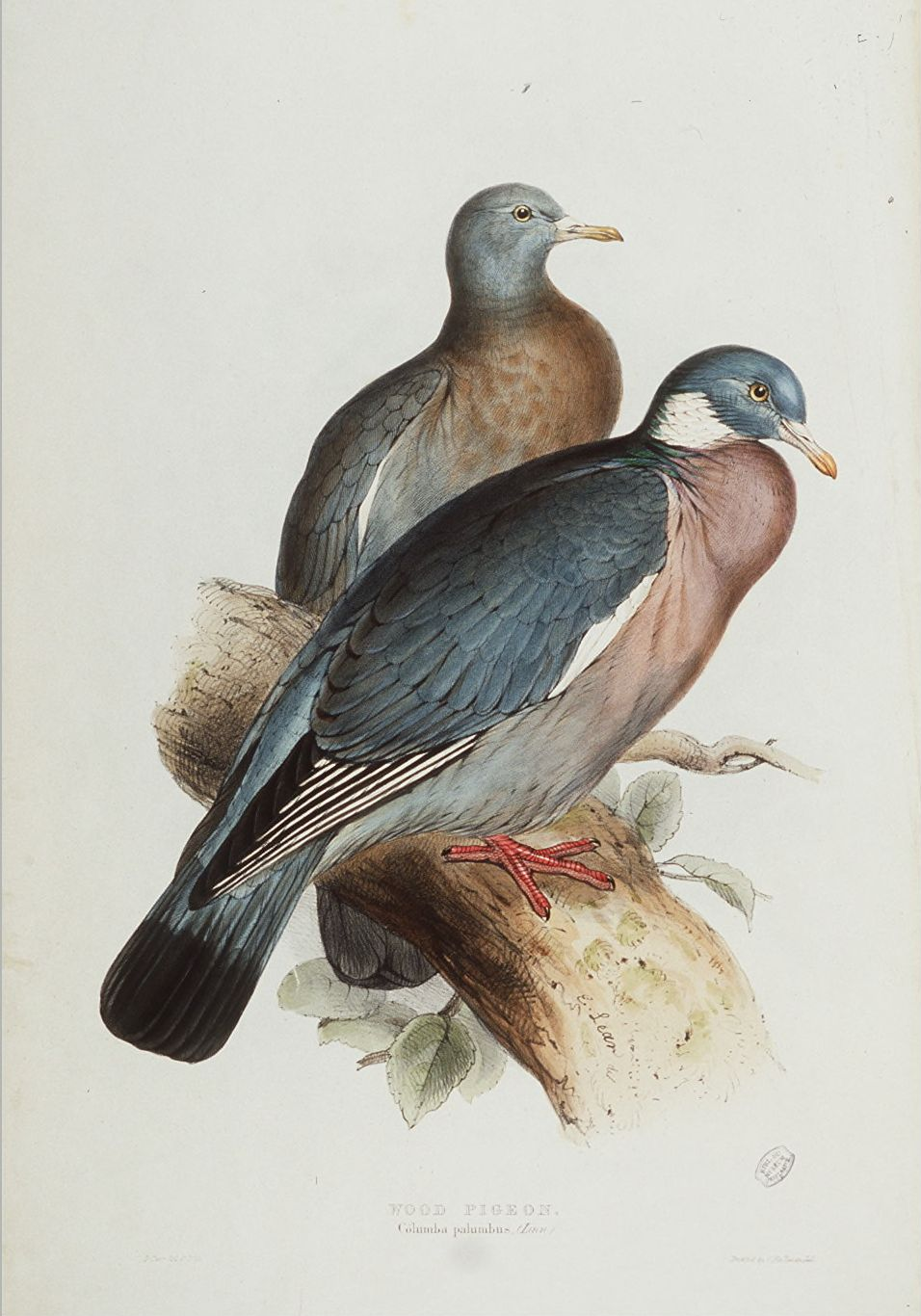
Pigeons (painting circa 1832–1837 by John Gould)

The Gemara interpreted the expression "two living birds" in Leviticus 14:4. The Gemara interpreted the word "living" to mean those whose principal limbs are living (excluding birds that are missing a limb) and to exclude treifah birds (birds with an injury or defect that would prevent them from living out a year). The Gemara interpreted the word "birds" (צִפֳּרִים, zipparim) to mean kosher birds. The Gemara deduced from the words of Deuteronomy 14:11, "Every bird (צִפּוֹר, zippor) that is clean you may eat," that some zipparim are forbidden as unclean—namely, birds slaughtered pursuant to Leviticus 14. The Gemara interpreted the words of Deuteronomy 14:12, "And these are they of which you shall not eat," to refer to birds slaughtered pursuant to Leviticus 14. And the Gemara taught that Deuteronomy 14:11–12 repeats the commandment so as to teach that one who consumes a bird slaughtered pursuant to Leviticus 14 infringes both a positive and a negative commandment.

The Mishnah taught that they buried meat that had mixed with milk in violation of Exodus 23:19 and 34:26 and Deuteronomy 14:21.

The Gemara noted the paradox that mother's milk is kosher even though it is a product of the mother's blood, which is not kosher. In explanation, the Gemara quoted Job 14:4: "Who can bring a pure thing out of an impure? Is it not the One?" For God can bring a pure thing, such as milk, out of an impure thing, such as blood.

Tractates Terumot, Ma'aserot, and Ma'aser Sheni in the Mishnah, Tosefta, and Jerusalem Talmud interpret the laws of tithes in Leviticus 27:30–33, Numbers 18:21–24, and Deuteronomy 14:22–29 and 26:12–14.

The precept of Deuteronomy 14:26 to rejoice on the festivals (or some say the precept of Deuteronomy 16:14 to rejoice on the festival of Sukkot) is incumbent upon women notwithstanding the general rule that the law does not bind women to observe precepts that depend on a certain time.

Reading the injunction of Deuteronomy 14:26, "And you shall rejoice, you and your household," a midrash taught that a man without a wife dwells without good, without help, without joy, without blessing, and without atonement. Without good, as Genesis 2:18 says that "it is not good that the man should be alone." Without help, as in Genesis 2:18, God says, "I will make him a help meet for him." Without joy, as Deuteronomy 14:26 says, "And you shall rejoice, you and your household" (implying that one can rejoice only when there is a "household" with whom to rejoice). Without a blessing, as Ezekiel 44:30 can be read, "To cause a blessing to rest on you for the sake of your house" (that is, for the sake of your wife). Without atonement, as Leviticus 16:11 says, "And he shall make atonement for himself, and for his house" (implying that one can make complete atonement only with a household). Rabbi Simeon said in the name of Rabbi Joshua ben Levi, without peace too, as 1 Samuel 25:6 says, "And peace be to your house." Rabbi Joshua of Siknin said in the name of Rabbi Levi, without life too, as Ecclesiastes 9:9 says, "Enjoy life with the wife whom you love." Rabbi Hiyya ben Gomdi said, also incomplete, as Genesis 5:2 says, "male and female created He them, and blessed them, and called their name Adam," that is, "man" (and thus only together are they "man"). Some say a man without a wife even impairs the Divine likeness, as Genesis 9:6 says, "For in the image of God made He man," and immediately thereafter Genesis 9:7 says, "And you, be fruitful, and multiply (implying that the former is impaired if one does not fulfill the latter).

Mishnah Peah 8:5–9, Tosefta Peah 4:2–10, and Jerusalem Talmud Peah 69b–73b interpreted Deuteronomy 14:28–29 and 26:12 regarding the tithe given to the poor and the Levite. Noting the words "shall eat and be satisfied" in Deuteronomy 14:29, the Sifre taught that one had to give the poor and the Levite enough to be satisfying to them. The Mishnah thus taught that they did not give the poor person at the threshing floor less than a half a kav (the equivalent in volume of 12 eggs, or roughly a liter) of wheat or a kav (roughly two liters) of barley. The Mishnah taught that they did not give the poor person wandering from place to place less than a loaf of bread. If the poor person stayed overnight, they gave the poor person enough to pay for a night's lodging. If the poor person stayed for the Sabbath, they gave the poor person three meals. The Mishnah taught that if one wanted to save some for poor relatives, one could take only half for poor relatives and needed to give at least half to other poor people.

A baraita deduced from the parallel use of the words "at the end" in Deuteronomy 14:28 (regarding tithes) and 31:10 (regarding the great assembly) that just as the Torah required the great assembly to be done at a festival, the Torah also required tithes to be removed at the time of a festival.

Noting that the discussion of gifts to the poor in Leviticus 23:22 appears between discussions of the festivals—Passover and Shavuot on one side, and Rosh Hashanah and Yom Kippur on the other—Rabbi Avardimos ben Rabbi Yossi said that this teaches that people who give immature clusters of grapes (as in Leviticus 19:10 and Deuteronomy 24:21), the forgotten sheaf (as in Deuteronomy 24:19), the corner of the field (as in Leviticus 19:9 and 23:22), and the poor tithe (as in Deuteronomy 14:28 and 26:12) is accounted as if the Temple existed and they offered up their sacrifices in it. And for those who do not give to the poor, it is accounted to them as if the Temple existed and they did not offer up their sacrifices in it.

=== Deuteronomy chapter 15 ===
Tractate Sheviit in the Mishnah, Tosefta, and Jerusalem Talmud interpreted the laws of the Sabbatical year in Exodus 23:10–11, Leviticus 25:1–34, and Deuteronomy 15:1–18 and 31:10–13. The Mishnah asked until when a field with trees could be plowed in the sixth year. The House of Shammai said as long as such work would benefit fruit that would ripen in the sixth year. But the House of Hillel said until Shavuot. The Mishnah observed that in reality, the views of two schools approximate each other. The Mishnah taught that one could plow a grain-field in the sixth year until the moisture had dried up in the soil (that it, after Passover, when rains in the Land of Israel cease) or as long as people still plowed in order to plant cucumbers and gourds (which need a great deal of moisture). Rabbi Simeon objected that if that were the rule, then we would place the law in the hands of each person to decide. But the Mishnah concluded that the prescribed period in the case of a grain-field was until Passover, and in the case of a field with trees, until Shavuot. But Rabban Gamaliel and his court ordained that working the land was permitted until the New Year that began the seventh year. Rabbi Johanan said that Rabban Gamaliel and his court reached their conclusion on Biblical authority, noting the common use of the term "Sabbath" (שַׁבַּת, Shabbat) in both the description of the weekly Sabbath in Exodus 31:15 and the Sabbath-year in Leviticus 25:4. Thus, just as in the case of the Sabbath Day, work is forbidden on the day itself, but allowed on the day before and the day after, so likewise in the Sabbath Year, tillage is forbidden during the year itself, but allowed in the year before and the year after.

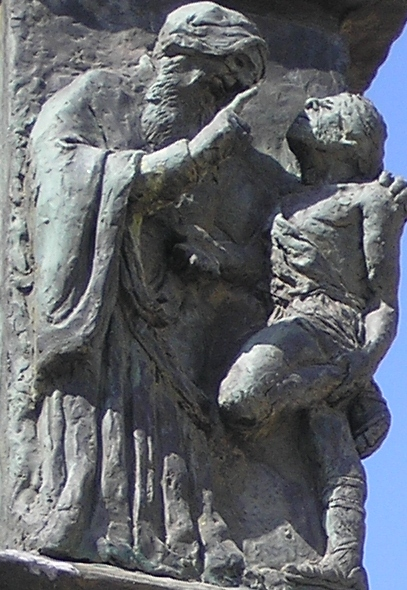
Hillel teaches the convert. (the Knesset Menorah, Jerusalem)

Chapter 10 of Tractate Sheviit in the Mishnah and Jerusalem Talmud and Tosefta Sheviit 8:3–11 interpreted Deuteronomy 15:1–10 to address debts and the Sabbatical year. The Mishnah held that the Sabbatical year cancelled loans, whether they were secured by a bond or not, but did not cancel debts to a shopkeeper or unpaid wages of a laborer, unless these debts were made into loans. When Hillel saw people refraining from lending, in transgression of Deuteronomy 15:9, he ordained the prosbul (פרוזבול), which ensured the repayment of loans notwithstanding the Sabbatical year. Citing the literal meaning of Deuteronomy 15:2—"this is the word of the release"—the Mishnah held that a creditor could accept payment of a debt notwithstanding an intervening Sabbatical year, if the creditor had first by word told the debtor that the creditor relinquished the debt. A prosbul prevents the remission of debts in the Sabbatical year. Hillel saw that people were unwilling to lend money to one another and disregarded the precept laid down in Deuteronomy 15:9, "Beware that there be not a base thought in your heart saying, ‘The seventh year, the year of release, is at hand'; and your eye be evil against your needy brother, and you give him nothing," and Hillel therefore decided to institute the prosbul. The text of the prosbul says: "I hand over to you, So-and-so, the judges in such-and-such a place, my bonds, so that I may be able to recover any money owing to me from So-and-so at any time I shall desire." And the judges or witnesses signed.

A baraita taught that Rabbi Judah HaNasi said that Deuteronomy 15:2 states in the context of the cancellation of debts: "And this is the manner of the abrogation: He shall abrogate." The verse speaks of two types of abrogation: One is the release of land, and one is the abrogation of monetary debts. Since the two are equated, one can learn that at a time when they release land, when the Jubilee Year is practiced, they abrogate monetary debts; but at a time when they do not release land, such as the present time, when the Jubilee Year is no longer practiced, they also do not abrogate monetary debts. But the Sages instituted that despite this, the Sabbatical Year still will abrogate debt in the present, in remembrance of the Torah-mandated Sabbatical Year. Hillel saw that the people of the nation refrained from lending to each other, so he instituted the prosbol.

Rabbi Isaac taught that the words of Psalm 103:20, "mighty in strength that fulfill His word," speak of those who observe the Sabbatical year. Rabbi Isaac said that we often find that a person fulfills a precept for a day, a week, or a month, but it is remarkable to find one who does so for an entire year. Rabbi Isaac asked whether one could find a mightier person than one who sees his field untilled, see his vineyard untilled, and yet pays his taxes and does not complain. And Rabbi Isaac noted that Psalm 103:20 uses the words "that fulfill His word (dabar)," and Deuteronomy 15:2 says regarding observance of the Sabbatical year, "And this is the manner (dabar) of the release," and argued that "dabar" means the observance of the Sabbatical year in both places.

Rabbi Shila of Nawha (a place east of Gadara in the Galilee) interpreted the word "needy" (אֶבְיוֹן, evyon) in Deuteronomy 15:7 to teach that one should give to the poor person from one's wealth, for that wealth is the poor person's, given to you in trust. Rabbi Abin observed that when a poor person stands at one's door, God stands at the person's right, as Psalm 109:31 says: "Because He stands at the right hand of the needy." If one gives something to a poor person, one should reflect that the One who stands at the poor person's right will reward the giver. And if one does not give anything to a poor person, one should reflect that the One who stands at the poor person's right will punish the one who did not give, as Psalm 109:31 says: "He stands at the right hand of the needy, to save him from them that judge his soul."

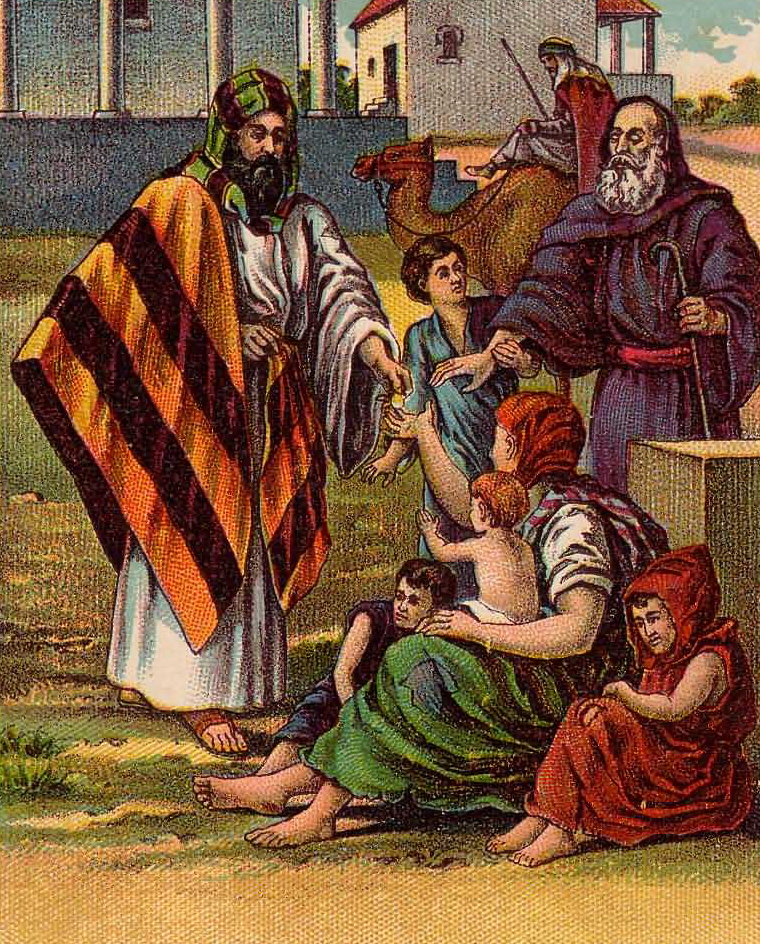
Charity (illustration from a Bible card published 1897 by the Providence Lithograph Company)

The Rabbis interpreted the words "sufficient for his need, whatever is lacking for him" in Deuteronomy 15:8 to teach the level to which the community must help an impoverished person. Based on these words, the Rabbis taught in a baraita that if an orphan applied to the community for assistance to marry, the community must rent a house, supply a bed and necessary household furnishings, and put on the wedding, as Deuteronomy 15:8 says, "sufficient for his need, whatever is lacking for him." The Rabbis interpreted the words "sufficient for his need" to refer to the house, "whatever is lacking" to refer to a bed and a table, and "for him (לוֹ, lo)" to refer to a wife, as Genesis 2:18 uses the same term, "for him (לוֹ, lo)," to refer to Adam's wife, whom Genesis 2:18 calls "a helpmate for him." The Rabbis taught that the words "sufficient for his need" command us to maintain the poor person, but not to make the poor person rich. But the Gemara interpreted the words "whatever is lacking for him" to include even a horse to ride upon and a servant to run before the impoverished person, if that was what the particular person lacked. The Gemara told that once Hillel bought for a certain impoverished man from an affluent family a horse to ride upon and a servant to run before him, and once when Hillel could not find a servant to run before the impoverished man, Hillel himself ran before him for three miles. The Rabbis taught in a baraita that once the people of Upper Galilee bought a pound of meat every day for an impoverished member of an affluent family of Sepphoris. Rav Huna taught that they bought for him a pound of premium poultry, or if you prefer, the amount of ordinary meat that they could buy with a pound of money. Rav Ashi taught that the place was such a small village with so few buyers for meat that every day they had to waste a whole animal just to provide for the pauper's needs. Once when a pauper applied to Rabbi Nehemiah for support, Rabbi Nehemiah asked him of what his meals consisted. The pauper told Rabbi Nehemiah that he had been used to eating well-marbled meat and aged wine. Rabbi Nehemiah asked him whether he could get by with Rabbi Nehemiah on a diet of lentils. The pauper consented, joined Rabbi Nehemiah on a diet of lentils, and then died. Rabbi Nehemiah lamented that he had caused the pauper's death by not feeding him the diet to which he had been accustomed, but the Gemara answered that the pauper himself was responsible for his own death, for he should not have allowed himself to become dependent on such a luxurious diet. Once when a pauper applied to Rava for support, Rava asked him of what his meals consisted. The pauper told Rava that he had been used to eating fattened chicken and aged wine. Rava asked the pauper whether he considered the burden on the community of maintaining such a lifestyle. The pauper replied that he was not eating what the community provided, but what God provided, as Psalm 145:15 says: "The eyes of all wait for You, and You give them their food in due season." As the verse does not say "in their season" (in the plural), but "in His season" (in the singular), it teaches that God provides every person the food that the person needs. Just then, Rava's sister, who had not seen him for 13 years, arrived with a fattened chicken and aged wine. Thereupon, Rava exclaimed at the coincidence, apologized to the pauper, and invited him to come and eat.

The Gemara turned to how the community should convey assistance to the pauper. Rabbi Meir taught that if a person has no means but does not wish to receive support from the community's charity fund, then the community should give the person what the person requires as a loan and then convert the loan into a gift by not collecting repayment. The Sages, however, said (as Rava explained their position) that the community should offer the pauper assistance as a gift, and then if the pauper declines the gift, the community should extend funds to the pauper as a loan. The Gemara taught that if a person has the means for self-support but chooses rather to rely on the community, then the community may give the person what the person needs as a gift, and then make the person repay it. As requiring repayment would surely cause the person to decline assistance on a second occasion, Rav Papa explained that the community exacts repayment from the person's estate upon the person's death. Rabbi Simeon taught that the community need not become involved if a person who has the means for self-support chooses not to do so. Rabbi Simeon taught that if a person has no means but does not wish to receive support from the community's charity fund, then the community should ask for a pledge in exchange for a loan, so as thereby to raise the person's self-esteem. The Rabbis taught in a baraita that the instruction to "lend" in Deuteronomy 15:8 refers to the person who has no means and is unwilling to receive assistance from the community's charity fund, and to whom the community must thus offer assistance as a loan and then give it as a gift. Rabbi Judah taught that the words "you . . . shall surely lend him" in Deuteronomy 15:8 refer to the person who has the means for self-support but chooses rather to rely on the community, to whom the community should give what the person needs as a gift, and then exact repayment from the person's estate upon the person's death. The Sages, however, said that the community has no obligation to help the person who has the means of self-support. According to the Sages, the use of the emphatic words "you . . . shall surely lend him" in Deuteronomy 15:8 (in which the Hebrew verb for "lend" is doubled—וְהַעֲבֵט, תַּעֲבִיטֶנּוּ) is merely stylistic and without legal significance.

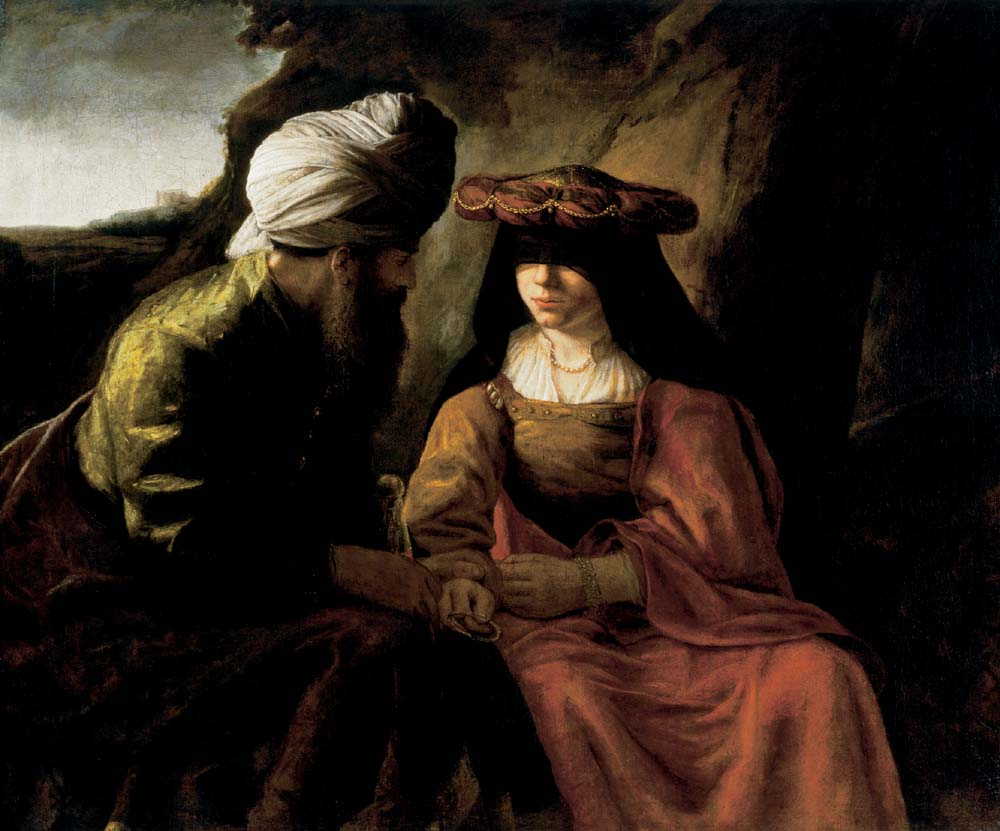
Judah and Tamar (painting circa 1650–1660 by the school of Rembrandt)

The Gemara related a story about how to give to the poor. A poor man lived in Mar Ukba's neighborhood, and every day Mar Ukba would put four zuz into the poor man's door socket. One day, the poor man thought that he would try to find out who did him this kindness. That day Mar Ukba came home from the house of study with his wife. When the poor man saw them moving the door to make their donation, the poor man went to greet them, but they fled and ran into a furnace from which the fire had just been swept. They did so because, as Mar Zutra bar Tobiah said in the name of Rav (or others say Rav Huna bar Bizna said in the name of Rabbi Simeon the Pious, and still others say Rabbi Johanan said in the name of Rabbi Simeon ben Yohai), it is better for a person to go into a fiery furnace than to shame a neighbor publicly. One can derive this from Genesis 38:25, where Tamar, who was subject to being burned for the adultery with which Judah had charged her, rather than publicly shame Judah with the facts of his complicity, sent Judah's possessions to him with the message, "By the man whose these are am I with child."

The Gemara related another story of Mar Ukba's charity. A poor man lived in Mar Ukba's neighborhood to whom he regularly sent 400 zuz on the eve of every Yom Kippur. Once Mar Ukba sent his son to deliver the 400 zuz. His son came back and reported that the poor man did not need Mar Ukba's help. When Mar Ukba asked his son what he had seen, his son replied that they were sprinkling aged wine before the poor man to improve the aroma in the room. Mar Ukba said that if the poor man was that delicate, then Mar Ukba would double the amount of his gift and send it back to the poor man.

When Mar Ukba was about to die, he asked to see his charity accounts. Finding gifts worth 7,000 Sijan gold denarii recorded therein, he exclaimed that the provisions were scanty, and the road was long, and he forthwith distributed half of his wealth to charity. The Gemara asked how Mar Ukba could have given away so much, when Rabbi Elai taught that when the Sanhedrin sat at Usha, it ordained that if a person wishes to give liberally the person should not give more than a fifth of the person's wealth. The Gemara explained that this limitation applies only during a person's lifetime, as the person might thereby be impoverished, but the limitation does not apply to gifts at death.

The Gemara related another story about a Sage's charity. Rabbi Abba used to bind money in his scarf, sling it on his back, and go among the poor so that they could take the funds they needed from his scarf. He would, however, look sideways as a precaution against swindlers.

Rabbi Hiyya bar Rav of Difti taught that Rabbi Joshua ben Korha deduced from the parallel use of the term "base" regarding withholding charity and practicing idolatry that people who shut their eyes against charity are like those who worship idols. Deuteronomy 15:9 says regarding aid to the poor, "Beware that there be not a base thought in your heart . . . and your eye will be evil against your poor brother," while Deuteronomy 13:14 uses the same term "base" when it says regarding idolatry, "Certain base fellows are gone out from the midst of you . . . saying: ‘Let us go and serve other gods there.'" That Deuteronomy employs the same adjective for both failings implies that withholding charity and practicing idolatry are similar.

A baraita taught that when envious men and plunderers of the poor multiplied, there increased those who hardened their hearts and closed their hands from lending to the needy, and they transgressed what is written in Deuteronomy 15:9, "Beware that there be not a base thought in your heart . . . and your eye be evil against your needy brother, and you give him nothing; and he cry unto the Lord against you, and it be sin in you."

In Deuteronomy 15:10, the heart is troubled. A midrash catalogued the wide range of additional capabilities of the heart reported in the Hebrew Bible. The heart speaks, sees, hears, walks, falls, stands, rejoices, cries, is comforted, becomes hardened, grows faint, grieves, fears, can be broken, becomes proud, rebels, invents, cavils, overflows, devises, desires, goes astray, lusts, is refreshed, can be stolen, is humbled, is enticed, errs, trembles, is awakened, loves, hates, envies, is searched, is rent, meditates, is like a fire, is like a stone, turns in repentance, becomes hot, dies, melts, takes in words, is susceptible to fear, gives thanks, covets, becomes hard, makes merry, acts deceitfully, speaks from out of itself, loves bribes, writes words, plans, receives commandments, acts with pride, makes arrangements, and aggrandizes itself.

Samuel read Deuteronomy 15:11 to teach that even the basic norms of society will remain the same in the Messianic Age. Rabbi Hiyya bar Abba said in the name of Rabbi Johanan that all the prophets prophesied only about the Messianic Age, but as for the World to Come, no eye has seen, beside God's. On this, Rabbi Hiyya bar Abba and Rabbi Johanan differed with Samuel, for Samuel taught that there is no difference between this world and the Messianic Age except that in the Messianic Age Jews will be independent of foreign powers, as Deuteronomy 15:11 says: "For the poor shall never cease out of the land" (implying that social stratification will remain in the Messianic Age).

Part of chapter 1 of Tractate Kiddushin in the Mishnah, Tosefta, Jerusalem Talmud, and Babylonian Talmud interpreted the laws of the Hebrew servant in Exodus 21:2–11 and 21:26–27; Leviticus 25:39–55; and Deuteronomy 15:12–18.

The Rabbis taught in a baraita that the words of Deuteronomy 15:16 regarding the Hebrew servant, "he fares well with you," indicate that the Hebrew servant had to be "with"—that is, equal to—the master in food and drink. Thus, the master could not eat white bread and have the servant eat black bread. The master could not drink old wine and have the servant drink new wine. The master could not sleep on a feather bed and have the servant sleep on straw. Hence, they said that buying a Hebrew servant was like buying a master. Similarly, Rabbi Simeon deduced from the words of Leviticus 25:41, "Then he shall go out from you, he and his children with him," that the master was liable to provide for the servant's children until the servant went out. And Rabbi Simeon deduced from the words of Exodus 21:3, "If he is married, then his wife shall go out with him," that the master was responsible to provide for the servant's wife, as well.

=== Deuteronomy chapter 16 ===
The Gemara noted that in listing the several festivals in Exodus 23:15, Leviticus 23:5, Numbers 28:16, and Deuteronomy 16:1, the Torah always begins with Passover.

Tractate Pesachim in the Mishnah, Tosefta, Jerusalem Talmud, and Babylonian Talmud interpreted the laws of the Passover in Exodus 12:3–27, 43–49; 13:6–10; 23:15; 34:25; Leviticus 23:4–8; Numbers 9:1–14; 28:16–25; and Deuteronomy 16:1–8.

The Mishnah noted differences between the first Passover in Exodus 12:3–27, 43–49; 13:6–10; 23:15; 34:25; Leviticus 23:4–8; Numbers 9:1–14; 28:16–25; and Deuteronomy 16:1–8. and the second Passover in Numbers 9:9–13. The Mishnah taught that the prohibitions of Exodus 12:19 that "seven days shall there be no leaven found in your houses" and of Exodus 13:7 that "no leaven shall be seen in all your territory" applied to the first Passover; while at the second Passover, one could have both leavened and unleavened bread in one's house. And the Mishnah taught that for the first Passover, one was required to recite the Hallel (Psalms 113–118) when the Passover lamb was eaten; while the second Passover did not require the reciting of Hallel when the Passover lamb was eaten. But both the first and second Passovers required the reciting of Hallel when the Passover lambs were offered, and both Passover lambs were eaten roasted with unleavened bread and bitter herbs. And both the first and second Passovers took precedence over the Sabbath.

The Mekhilta of Rabbi Ishmael taught that there are four types of children (as evinced by the four times—in Exodus 12:26; 13:8; 13:14; and Deuteronomy 6:20—that Scripture reports telling a child)—the wise, the simple, the wicked, and the type who does not know how to ask. The wise child asks, in the words of Deuteronomy 6:20: "What mean the testimonies, and the statutes, and the ordinances, that the Lord our God has commanded you?" The Mekhilta taught that we explain to this child all the laws of Passover. The simple child asks, in the words of Exodus 13:14: "What is this?" The Mekhilta taught that we respond simply with the words of Exodus 13:14: "By strength of hand the Lord brought us out from Egypt, from the house of bondage." The wicked child asks, in the words of Exodus 12:26: "What do you mean by this service?" The Mekhilta taught that because wicked children exclude themselves, we should also exclude this child in answering and say, in the words of Exodus 13:8: "It is because of what the Lord did for me when I came forth out of Egypt"—for me but not for you; had you been there, you would not have been saved. As for the child who does not know how to ask, the Mekhilta taught that we take the initiative, as Exodus 13:8 says (without having reported that the child asked), "You shall tell your child on that day."

Tractate Beitzah in the Mishnah, Tosefta, Jerusalem Talmud, and Babylonian Talmud interpreted the laws common to all of the festivals in Exodus 12:3–27, 43–49; 13:6–10; 23:16; 34:18–23; Leviticus 16; 23:4–43; Numbers 9:1–14; 28:16–30:1; and Deuteronomy 16:1–17; 31:10–13.

Rabbi Elazar ben Azariah argued that Jews must mention the Exodus every night (as in the third paragraph of the Shema, Numbers 15:37–41), but did not prevail in his argument that this was a Biblical obligation until Ben Zoma argued that Deuteronomy 16:3, which commands a Jew to remember the Exodus "all the days of your life," uses the word "all" to mean both day and night. But the Safes explained the word "all" differently and say, "The days of your life," refers to the days in this world, and "all" is added to include the days of the Messiah.

Rabbi Huna taught in Hezekiah's name that Deuteronomy 16:6 can help reveal when Isaac was born. Reading Genesis 21:2, “And Sarah conceived, and bore Abraham a son (Isaac) in his old age, at the set time (מּוֹעֵד, mo'ed) of which God had spoken to him,” Rabbi Huna taught in Hezekiah's name that Isaac was born at midday. For Genesis 21:2 uses the term “set time” (מּוֹעֵד, mo'ed), and Deuteronomy 16:6 uses the same term when it reports, “At the season (מּוֹעֵד, mo'ed) that you came forth out of Egypt.” As Exodus 12:51 can be read, “And it came to pass in the middle of that day that the Lord brought the children of Israel out of the land of Egypt,” we know that Israel left Egypt at midday, and thus Deuteronomy 16:6 refers to midday when it says “season” (מּוֹעֵד, mo'ed), and one can read “season” (מּוֹעֵד, mo'ed) to mean the same thing in both Deuteronomy 16:6 and Genesis 21:2.

Rabbi Joshua maintained that rejoicing on a festival is a religious duty. For it was taught in a baraita: Rabbi Eliezer said: A person has nothing else to do on a festival aside from either eating and drinking or sitting and studying. Rabbi Joshua said: Divide it: Devote half of the festival to eating and drinking, and half to the House of Study. Rabbi Johanan said: Both deduce this from the same verse. One verse Deuteronomy 16:8 says, “a solemn assembly to the Lord your God,” while Numbers 29:35 says, “there shall be a solemn assembly to you.” Rabbi Eliezer held that this means either entirely to God or entirely to you. But Rabbi Joshua held: Divide it: Devote half the festival to God and half to yourself.

The Mishnah reported that Jews read Deuteronomy 16:9–12 on Shavuot. So as to maintain a logical unit including at least 15 verses, Jews now read Deuteronomy 15:19–16:17 on Shavuot.

Tractate Sukkah in the Mishnah, Tosefta, Jerusalem Talmud, and Babylonian Talmud interpreted the laws of Sukkot in Exodus 23:16; 34:22; Leviticus 23:33–43; Numbers 29:12–34; and Deuteronomy 16:13–17; 31:10–13.

The Mishnah taught that a sukkah can be no more than 20 cubits high. Rabbi Judah, however, declared taller sukkot valid. The Mishnah taught that a sukkah must be at least 10 handbreadths high, have three walls, and have more shade than sun. The House of Shammai declared invalid a sukkah made 30 days or more before the festival, but the House of Hillel pronounced it valid. The Mishnah taught that if one made the sukkah for the purpose of the festival, even at the beginning of the year, it is valid.

The Mishnah taught that a sukkah under a tree is as invalid as a sukkah within a house. If one sukkah is erected above another, the upper one is valid, but the lower is invalid. Rabbi Judah said that if there are no occupants in the upper one, then the lower one is valid.

It invalidates a sukkah to spread a sheet over the sukkah because of the sun, or beneath it because of falling leaves, or over the frame of a four-post bed. One may spread a sheet, however, over the frame of a two-post bed.

It is not valid to train a vine, gourd, or ivy to cover a sukkah and then cover it with sukkah covering (s'chach). If, however, the sukkah-covering exceeds the vine, gourd, or ivy in quantity, or if the vine, gourd, or ivy is detached, it is valid. The general rule is that one may not use for sukkah-covering anything that is susceptible to ritual impurity (tumah) or that does not grow from the soil. But one may use for sukkah-covering anything not susceptible to ritual impurity that grows from the soil.

Bundles of straw, wood, or brushwood may not serve as sukkah-covering. But any of them, if they are untied, are valid. All materials are valid for the walls.

Rabbi Judah taught that one may use planks for the sukkah-covering, but Rabbi Meir taught that one may not. The Mishnah taught that it is valid to place a plank four handbreadths wide over the sukkah, provided that one does not sleep under it.

The Rabbis taught that Jews are duty bound to make their children and their household rejoice on a festival, for Deuteronomy 16:14 says, "And you shall rejoice it, your feast, you and your son and your daughter." The Gemara taught that one makes them rejoice with wine. Rabbi Judah taught that men gladden with what is suitable for them, and women with what is suitable for them. The Gemara explained that what is suitable for men is wine. And Rav Joseph taught that in Babylonia, they gladdened women with colored garments, while in the Land of Israel, they gladdened women with pressed linen garments.

The Gemara deduced from the parallel use of the word "appear" in Exodus 23:14 and Deuteronomy 16:15 (regarding appearance offerings) on the one hand, and in Deuteronomy 31:10–12 (regarding the great assembly) on the other hand, that the criteria for who participated in the great assembly also applied to limit who needed to bring appearance offerings. A baraita deduced from the words "that they may hear" in Deuteronomy 31:12 that a deaf person was not required to appear at the assembly. And the baraita deduced from the words "that they may learn" in Deuteronomy 31:12 that a mute person was not required to appear at the assembly. But the Gemara questioned the conclusion that one who cannot talk cannot learn, recounting the story of two mute grandsons (or others say nephews) of Rabbi Johanan ben Gudgada who lived in Rabbi's neighborhood. Rabbi prayed for them, and they were healed. And it turned out that notwithstanding their speech impediment, they had learned halachah, Sifra, Sifre, and the whole Talmud. Mar Zutra and Rav Ashi read the words "that they may learn" in Deuteronomy 31:12 to mean "that they may teach," and thus to exclude people who could not speak from the obligation to appear at the assembly. Rabbi Tanhum deduced from the words "in their ears" (using the plural for "ears") at the end of Deuteronomy 31:11 that one who was deaf in one ear was exempt from appearing at the assembly.

The first chapter of Tractate Chagigah in the Mishnah, Tosefta, Jerusalem Talmud, and Babylonian Talmud interpreted Deuteronomy 16:16–17 regarding the obligation to bring an offering on the three pilgrim festivals.

The Mishnah taught that the Torah set no amount for the appearance offerings that Exodus 23:14–17 and 34:20 and Deuteronomy 16:16 required the Israelites to bring for the three annual pilgrimage festivals.

== In medieval Jewish interpretation ==
The parashah is discussed in these medieval Jewish sources:

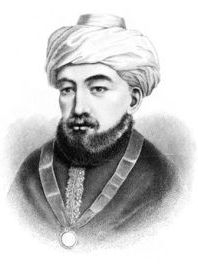
Moses Maimonides

=== Deuteronomy chapter 11 ===
In his Mishneh Torah, Maimonides hinged his discussion of free will on Deuteronomy 11:26–28, "Behold, I set before you this day a blessing and a curse." Maimonides taught that God grants free will to all people. One can choose to turn to good or evil.

Maimonides taught that people should not entertain the thesis that at the time of their creation, God decrees whether they will be righteous or wicked (what some call "predestination"). Rather, each person is fit to be righteous or wicked. Jeremiah implied this in Lamentations 3:38: "From the mouth of the Most High, neither evil nor good come forth." Accordingly, sinners, themselves, cause their own loss. It is thus proper for people to mourn for their sins and for the evil consequences that they have brought upon their own souls. Jeremiah continues that since free choice is in our hands and our own decision prompts us to commit wrongs, it is proper for us to repent and abandon our wickedness, for the choice is in our hands. This is implied by Lamentations 3:40, "Let us search and examine our ways and return [to God]." Maimonides taught that this principle is a pillar on which the Torah and the commandments rest, as Deuteronomy 30:15 says, "Behold, I have set before you today life and good, death and evil," and Deuteronomy 11:26 says, "Behold, I have set before you today the blessing and the curse," implying that the choice is in our hands.

Maimonides argued that the idea that God decrees that an individual is righteous or wicked (as imagined by astrology) is inconsistent with God's command through the prophets to "do this" or "not do this." For according to this mistaken conception, from the beginning of humanity's creation, their nature would draw them to a particular quality, and they could not depart from it. Maimonides saw such a view as inconsistent with the entire Torah, with the justice of retribution for the wicked or reward for the righteous, and with the idea that the world's Judge acts justly.

Maimonides taught that even so, nothing happens in the world without God's permission and desire, as Psalm 135:6 says, "Whatever God wishes, He has done in the heavens and in the earth." Maimonides said that everything happens in accord with God's will, and, nevertheless, we are responsible for our deeds. Explaining how this apparent contradiction is resolved, Maimonides said that just as God desired that fire rises upward and water descends downward, so too, God desired that people have free choice and be responsible for their deeds, without being pulled or forced. Rather, people, on their own initiative, with the knowledge that God granted them, do anything that people can do. Therefore, people are judged according to their deeds. If they do good, they are treated with beneficence. If they do bad, they are treated harshly. This is implied by the prophets.

Maimonides acknowledged that one might ask: Since God knows everything that will occur before it comes to pass, does God not know whether a person will be righteous or wicked? And if God knows that a person will be righteous, it would appear impossible for that person not to be righteous. However, if one would say that despite God's knowledge that the person would be righteous it is possible for the person to be wicked, then God's knowledge would be incomplete. Maimonides taught that just as it is beyond human potential to comprehend God's essential nature, as Exodus 33:20 says, "No man will perceive Me and live," so, too, it is beyond human potential to comprehend God's knowledge. This was what Isaiah intended when Isaiah 55:8 says, "For My thoughts are not your thoughts, nor your ways, My ways." Accordingly, we do not have the potential to conceive how God knows all the creations and their deeds. But Maimonides said that it is without doubt that people's actions are in their own hands and God does not decree them. Consequently, the prophets taught that people are judged according to their deeds.

=== Deuteronomy chapter 12 ===
Expounding Deuteronomy 12:20, Maimonides taught that one should not kill animals for the purpose of practicing cruelty or for sport.

Maimonides taught that God instituted the practice of sacrifices and confined it to one Sanctuary in Deuteronomy 12:26 as transitional steps to wean the Israelites off of the worship of the times and move them toward prayer as the primary means of worship. Maimonides noted that in nature, God created animals that develop gradually. For example, when a mammal is born, it is extremely tender, and cannot eat dry food, so God provided breasts that yield milk to feed the young animal, until it can eat dry food. Similarly, Maimonides taught, God instituted many laws as temporary measures, as it would have been impossible for the Israelites suddenly to discontinue everything to which they had become accustomed. So God sent Moses to make the Israelites (in the words of Exodus 19:6) "a kingdom of priests and a holy nation." But the general custom of worship in those days was sacrificing animals in temples that contained idols. So God did not command the Israelites to give up those manners of service, but allowed them to continue. God transferred to God's service what had formerly served as a worship of idols, and commanded the Israelites to serve God in the same manner—namely, to build to a Sanctuary (Exodus 25:8), to erect the altar to God's name (Exodus 20:21), to offer sacrifices to God (Leviticus 1:2), to bow down to God, and to burn incense before God. God forbad doing any of these things to any other being and selected priests for the service in the temple in Exodus 28:41. By this Divine plan, God blotted out the traces of idolatry, and established the great principle of the Existence and Unity of God. But the sacrificial service, Maimonides taught, was not the primary object of God's commandments about sacrifice; rather, supplications, prayers, and similar kinds of worship are nearer to the primary object. Thus, God limited sacrifice to only one temple (see Deuteronomy 12:26) and the priesthood to only the members of a particular family. These restrictions, Maimonides taught, served to limit sacrificial worship, and kept it within such bounds that God did not feel it necessary to abolish sacrificial service altogether. But in the Divine plan, prayer and supplication can be offered everywhere and by every person, as can be the wearing of tzitzit (Numbers 15:38) and tefillin (Exodus 13:9, 16) and similar kinds of service.

=== Deuteronomy chapter 13 ===
Citing Deuteronomy 13:5, Baḥya ibn Paquda taught that love and reverence for God is a leading example of an affirmative duty of the heart. And citing Deuteronomy 15:7, Baḥya taught that not to harden one’s heart against the poor is a leading example of a negative duty of the heart.

Baḥya ibn Paquda read Deuteronomy 13:9, "neither shall you pity him, have mercy upon him, nor shield him," to teach that ruthlessness is appropriate in paying back the wicked and exacting vengeance on the corrupt.

=== Deuteronomy chapter 14 ===
Baḥya ibn Paquda taught that whenever God shows special goodness to people, they are obligated to serve God. When God increases God's favor to a person, that person is obligated to render additional service for it. Baḥya taught that this is illustrated by the duty to tithe produce, as Deuteronomy 14:22 says, "You shall tithe all the yield of your seed that comes from the field year by year." One to whom God has given one hundred measures of produce is obliged to give ten measures; one to whom God has given only ten measures has to give one measure. If the former were to separate nine and a half measures and the latter were to separate one measure, the former would be punished, while the latter would be rewarded. Analogously, if God singles out a person for special favor, that person is under an obligation of increased service as an expression of gratitude for that favor.

=== Deuteronomy chapter 15 ===
Maimonides taught that the Law correctly says in Deuteronomy 15:11, "You shall open your hand wide to your brother, to your poor." Maimonides continued that the Law taught how far we have to extend this principle of treating kindly everyone with whom we have some relationship—even if the other person offended or wronged us, even if the other person is very bad, we still must have some consideration for the other person. Thus Deuteronomy 23:8 says: "You shall not abhor an Edomite, for he is your brother." And if we find a person in trouble, whose assistance we once enjoyed, or of whom we have received some benefit, even if that person has subsequently wronged us, we must bear in mind that person's previous good conduct. Thus Deuteronomy 23:8 says: "You shall not abhor an Egyptian, because you were a stranger in his land," although the Egyptians subsequently oppressed the Israelites very much.

=== Deuteronomy chapter 16 ===
Reading Deuteronomy 16:14, "You shall rejoice in your festival, with your son and daughter, . . . the stranger, the fatherless, and the widow in your communities," Maimonides taught that those who celebrate a holiday are obligated to feed the destitute and the poor, and those who eat and drink only with family, without feeding the poor, are not practicing the rejoicing according to the commandment, but merely the rejoicing of their gut. Maimonides argued that such rejoicing is a disgrace.

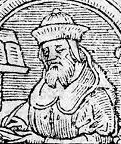
Rashi

The Daas Zekeinim (a collection of comments by Tosafists) noted that the Torah uses variations of the word “joy” (שמחה, simchah) three times in connection with Sukkot (in Leviticus 23:40 and Deuteronomy 16:14 and 16:15), only once in connection with Shavuot (in Deuteronomy 16:11), and not at all in connection with Passover. The Daas Zekeinim explained that it was only at the completion of the harvest and Sukkot that one was able to be completely joyful.

Rashi read the words of Deuteronomy 16:15, “and you will only be happy,” according to its plain meaning, not as a command, but rather as an expression of an assurance that one will be happy. But Rashi noted that the Rabbis deduced from this language an obligation to include the night before the last day of the Festival (Shemini Atzeret) in the obligation to rejoice.

== In modern interpretation ==
The parashah is discussed in these modern sources:

=== Deuteronomy chapters 11–29 ===
Peter Craigie saw in Deuteronomy 11:26–29:1 the following chiastic structure centered on the specific legislation, stressing the importance of the blessing and curse contingent upon obedience to the legislation both in the present and in the future.

A: The blessing and curse in the present renewal of the covenant (Deuteronomy 11:26–28)

B: The blessing and curse in the future renewal of the covenant (Deuteronomy 11:29–32)

C: The specific legislation (Deuteronomy 12:1–26:19)

B^{1}:The blessing and curse in the future renewal of the covenant (Deuteronomy 27:1–26)

A^{1}:The blessing and curse in the present renewal of the covenant (Deuteronomy 28:1–29:1)

=== Deuteronomy chapter 12 ===
Gerhard von Rad argued that the ordinances for standardizing the cult and establishing only one sanctuary are the most distinctive feature in Deuteronomy's new arrangements for ordering Israel's life before God. Von Rad cited Deuteronomy 12; 14:22–29; 15:19–23; 16; 17:8–13; 18:1–8; and 19:1–13 among a small number of "centralizing laws" that he argued belong closely together and were a special, later stratum in Deuteronomy. Von Rad wrote that the centralizing law appears in a triple form in Deuteronomy 12—verses 2–7, 8–12, and 13–19—each built on the statement, which Von Rad called the real centralizing formula, that Israel be allowed to offer sacrifices solely in that place that God would choose in one of the tribes "to make His name dwell there." Von Rad argued that these texts indicate that Israel's cult had become completely lacking in unity, celebrating at former Canaanite shrines intended for Baal. The instructions to centralize the cult sprang from the conviction that the cult in the different country shrines could no longer be reincorporated into the ordinances of a pure faith in God. Sorel Goldberg Loeb and Barbara Binder Kadden wrote that Von Rad saw the Book of Deuteronomy and this section in particular as a way of getting the Israelites back on track, as the Israelites had been influenced by other nations whose worship habits did not coincide with the Israelite belief system.

Comparing the three versions—Deuteronomy 12:2–7, 8–12, and 13–19—Von Rad argued that Deuteronomy 12:2–7 addressed the non-Israelite cultic practice of the Canaanites, taking an aggressive attitude because the Canaanite cults had been brought back to life within the Israelite cultic domain. Deuteronomy 12:8–12 explains the new position historically, demanding that the Israelites not act as before. Von Rad noted that Deuteronomy 12:13–19 alone of the three is composed in the second person singular and was thus the earliest. It begins at once with the demand for centralization and explicitly draws the conclusion that the other two versions appear to assume tacitly, that slaughtering for secular use is permitted. Von Rad understood Deuteronomy 12:13–19 in connection with King Josiah's planned expansion reflected in 2 Kings 23:15 and 19, arguing that Deuteronomy 12:13–19 adapted an earlier Northern text to Judean conditions, possibly envisaging David's increase of territory (as reflected in 1 Kings 8:65) and especially the former Canaanite plain in the west, which had no Israelite sanctuaries.

Jeffrey Tigay called the requirement that sacrifices be offered only in a single sanctuary "the most singular" of all the laws in Deuteronomy. Tigay reported eight major approaches to why Deuteronomy called for this reform: (1) To minimize the role of sacrifice in worship, in preference to prayer. (See Maimonides in "In medieval Jewish interpretation" above.) (2) To preserve the Temple's ability to inspire people by keeping it unique. (3) Hezekiah's political goals to concentrate national enthusiasm on the preservation of the capital from the invading Assyrians. (4) Josiah's economic goal to wrest control of the peasantry's agricultural surplus from the rural Levites to use for royal purposes such as defense. (5) Monotheism, connecting the requirement for a single sanctuary to the belief that there is only one God. (See Josephus in "In early nonrabbinic interpretation" above.) (6) Monolatry, forcing the people to bring to God the sacrifices that they had been making out in the field to goat-demons (satyrs) or other gods. (7) Monoyahwism, to avoid the suggestion that there were several deities named YHVH. (8) Multiple worship sites were inherently pagan. Tigay concluded that the view that sacrificing at multiple sites was considered inherently pagan is the only explanation with explicit textual support from the passage that forbids the practice.

=== Deuteronomy chapter 14 ===
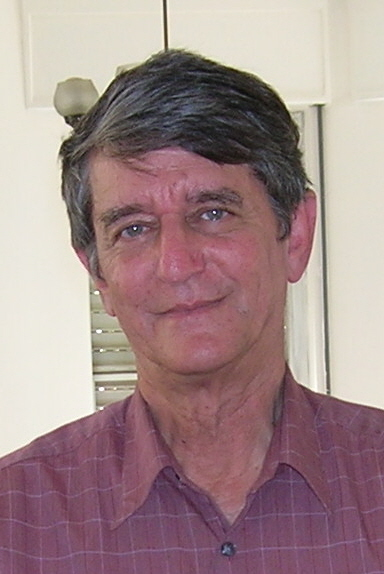
Kugel

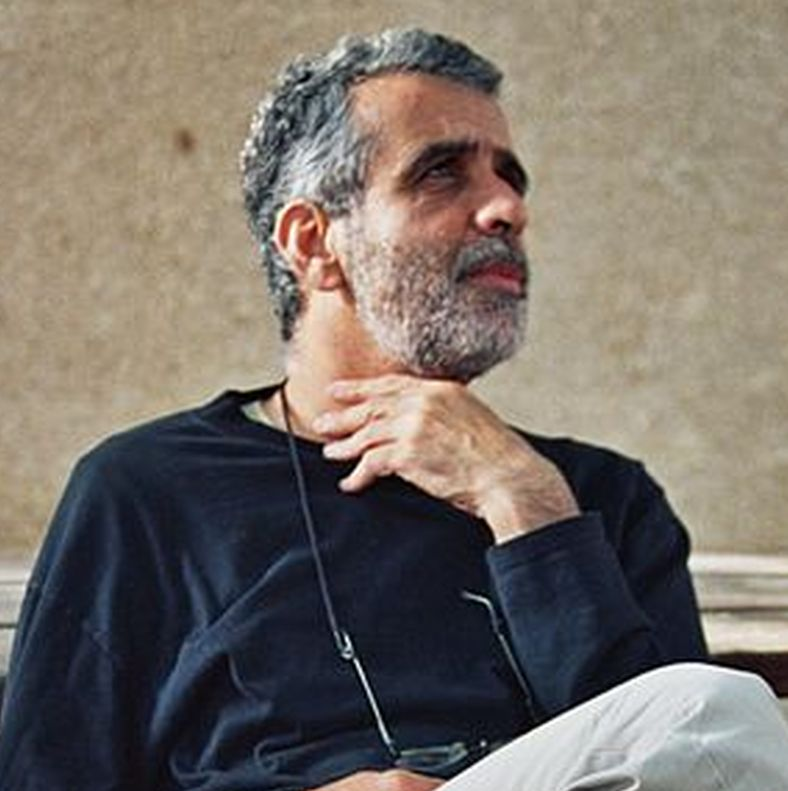
Finkelstein

James Kugel reported that Israel Finkelstein found no pig bones in hilltop sites starting in the Iron I period (roughly 1200–1000 BCE) and continuing through Iron II, while before that, in Bronze Age sites, pig bones abounded. Kugel deduced from Finkelstein's data that the new hilltop residents were fundamentally different from both their predecessors in the highlands and the city Canaanites—either because they were a different ethnic group, or because they had adopted a different way of life, for ideological or other reasons. Kugel inferred from Finkelstein's findings that these highlanders shared some ideology (if only a food taboo), like modern-day Jews and Muslims. And Kugel concluded that the discontinuities between their way of life and that of the Canaanite city dwellers and earlier highland settlers supported the idea that the settlers were not exurbanites.

Interpreting the laws of kashrut in Leviticus 11 and Deuteronomy 14:3–21, in 1997, the Committee on Jewish Law and Standards of Conservative Judaism held that it is possible for a genetic sequence to be adapted from a non-kosher species and implanted in a new strain of a kosher foodstuff—for example, for a gene for swine growth hormone to be introduced into a potato to induce larger growth, or for a gene from an insect to be introduced into a tomato plant to give it unusual qualities of pest resistance—and that new strain to be kosher. Similarly, in the late 1990s, the Central Conference of American Rabbis of Reform Judaism ruled that it is a good thing for a Jew who observes kashrut to participate in a medical experiment involving a pork byproduct.

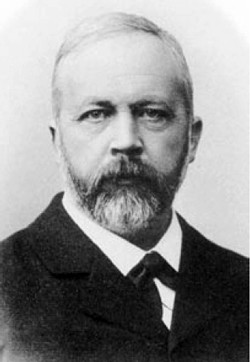
Wellhausen

=== Deuteronomy chapter 16 ===
Julius Wellhausen conceived of early Israelite religion as linked to nature's annual cycle and believed that Scripture only later connected the festivals to historical events like the Exodus from Egypt. Kugel reported that modern scholars generally agreed that Passover reflects two originally separate holidays arising out of the annual harvest cycle. One festival involved the sacrificing and eating of an animal from the flock, the pesa sacrifice, which arose among shepherds who sacrificed in the light of the full moon of the month that marked the vernal equinox and the end of winter (as directed in Exodus 12:6) to bring divine favor for a safe and prosperous summer for the rest of the flock. The shepherds slaughtered the animal at home, as the rite also stipulated that some of the animal's blood be daubed on the doorposts and lintel of the house (as directed in Exodus 12:7) to ward off evil. The rite prescribed that no bone be broken (as directed in Exodus 12:46) so as not to bring evil on the flock from which the sacrifice came. Scholars suggest that the name pesa derived from the verb that means "hop" (as in 1 Kings 18:21 and 26) and theorize that the holiday may originally have involved some sort of ritual "hopping." A second festival—the Festival of Unleavened Bread—involved farmers eating unleavened barley bread for seven days when the winter's barley crop had reached maturity and was ready for harvest. Farmers observed this festival with a trip to a local sanctuary (as in Exodus 23:17 and 34:23). Modern scholars believe that the absence of yeast in the bread indicated purity (as in Leviticus 2:11). The listing of festivals in Exodus 23:14–17 and 34:18–23 appear to provide evidence for the independent existence of the Festival of Unleavened Bread. Modern scholars suggest that the farmers’ Festival of Unleavened Bread and the shepherds’ Passover later merged into a single festival, Passover moved from the home to the Temple, and the combined festival was explicitly connected to the Exodus (as in Deuteronomy 16:1–4).

Diagram of the Documentary Hypothesis

== In critical analysis ==
Some scholars who follow the Documentary Hypothesis attribute the parashah to two separate sources. These scholars often attribute the material beginning at Deuteronomy 12:1 through the balance of the parashah to the original Deuteronomic Code (sometimes abbreviated Dtn). These scholars then posit that the first Deuteronomistic historian (sometimes abbreviated Dtr 1) added the material at the beginning of the parashah, Deuteronomy 11:26–32, in the edition of Deuteronomy that existed during Josiah's time.

== Commandments ==
According to Sefer ha-Chinuch, there are 17 positive and 38 negative commandments in the parashah.

- To destroy idols and their accessories
- Not to destroy objects associated with God's Name
- To bring all avowed and freewill offerings to the Temple on the first subsequent festival
- Not to offer any sacrifices outside the Temple courtyard
- To offer all sacrifices in the Temple
- To redeem dedicated animals which have become disqualified
- Not to eat the second tithe of grains outside Jerusalem
- Not to eat the second tithe of wine products outside Jerusalem
- Not to eat the second tithe of oil outside Jerusalem
- The Kohanim must not eat unblemished firstborn animals outside Jerusalem
- The Kohanim must not eat sacrificial meat outside the Temple courtyard
- Not to eat the meat of the burnt offering
- Not to eat the meat of minor sacrifices before sprinkling the blood on the altar
- The Kohanim must not eat firstfruits before they are set down in the Sanctuary grounds
- Not to refrain from rejoicing with, and giving gifts to, the Levites
- To ritually slaughter an animal before eating it
- Not to eat a limb or part taken from a living animal
- To bring all sacrifices from outside Israel to the Temple
- Not to add to the Torah commandments or their oral explanations
- Not to diminish from the Torah any commandments, in whole or in part
- Not to listen to a false prophet
- Not to love an enticer to idolatry
- Not to cease hating the enticer to idolatry
- Not to save the enticer to idolatry
- Not to say anything in defense of the enticer to idolatry
- Not to refrain from incriminating the enticer to idolatry
- Not to entice an individual to idol worship
- Carefully interrogate the witness
- To burn a city that has turned to idol worship
- Not to rebuild it as a city
- Not to derive benefit from it
- Not to tear the skin in mourning
- Not to make a bald spot in mourning
- Not to eat sacrifices which have become unfit or blemished
- To examine the signs of fowl to distinguish between kosher and non-kosher
- Not to eat non-kosher flying insects
- Not to eat the meat of an animal that died without ritual slaughter
- To set aside the second tithe (Ma'aser Sheni)
- To separate the tithe for the poor
- Not to pressure or claim from the borrower after the seventh year
- To press the idolater for payment
- To release all loans during the seventh year
- Not to withhold charity from the poor
- To give charity
- Not to refrain from lending immediately before the release of the loans for fear of monetary loss
- Not to send the Hebrew slave away empty-handed
- Give the Hebrew slave gifts when he goes free
- Not to work consecrated animals
- Not to shear the fleece of consecrated animals
- Not to eat chametz on the afternoon of the 14th day of Nisan
- Not to leave the meat of the holiday offering of the 14th until the 16th
- Not to offer a Passover offering on one's provisional altar
- To rejoice on these three Festivals
- To be seen at the Temple on Passover, Shavuot, and Sukkot
- Not to appear at the Temple without offerings

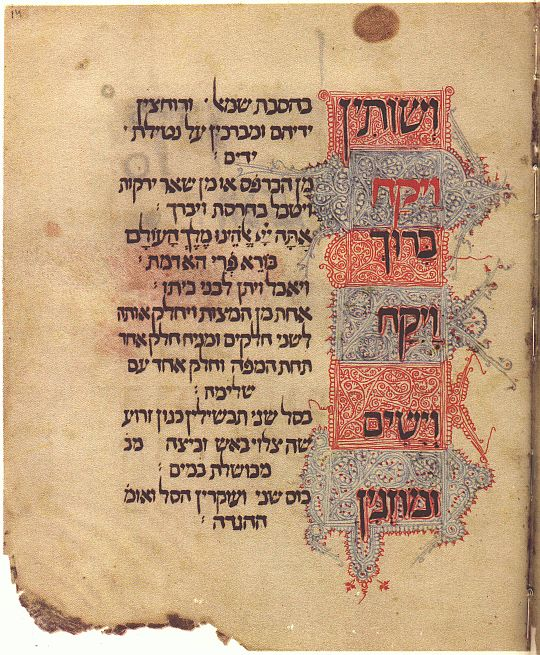
A page from the Kaufmann Haggadah

== In the liturgy ==
The parashah is reflected in these parts of the Jewish liturgy:

Reuven Hammer noted that Mishnah Tamid 5:1 recorded what was in effect the first siddur, as a part of which priests daily recited Deuteronomy 11:13–21.

In the Passover Haggadah (which takes the story from Mishnah Berakhot 1:5), Rabbi Eleazar ben Azariah discusses Ben Zoma's exposition on Deuteronomy 16:3 in the discussion among the Rabbis at Bnei Brak in the answer to the Four Questions (Ma Nishtana) in the magid section of the Seder.

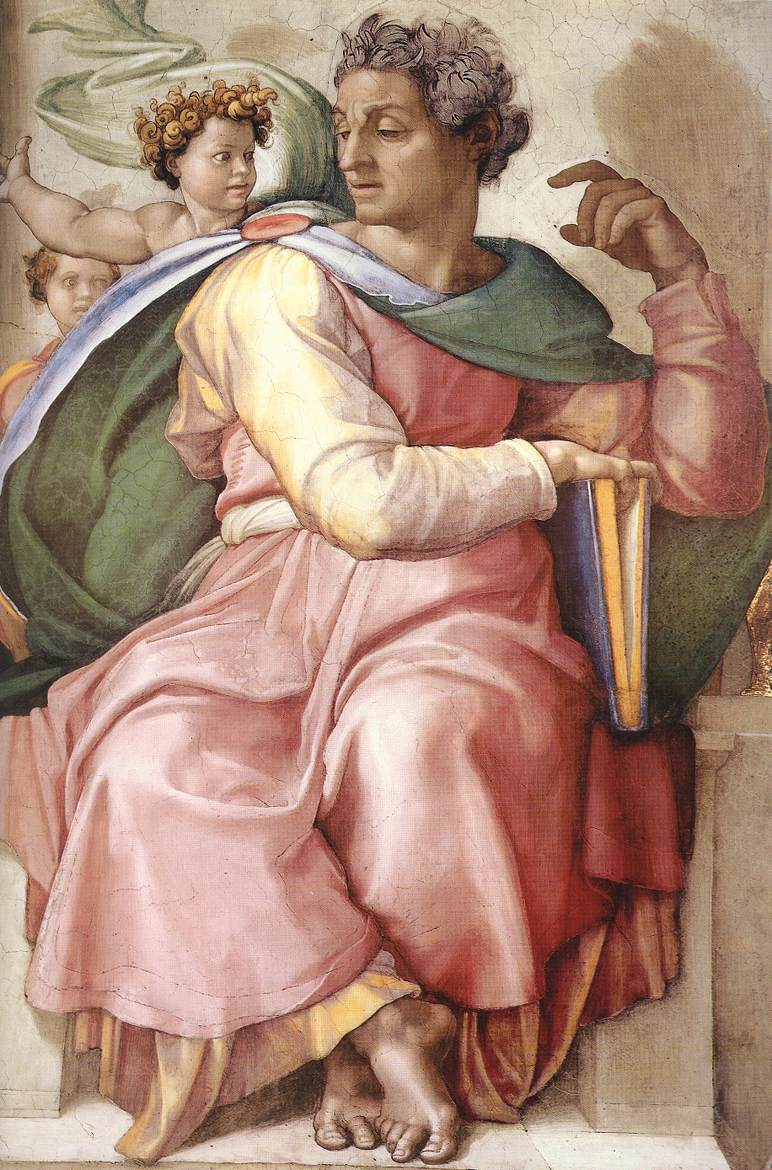
Isaiah (fresco by Michelangelo)

== Haftarah ==
The haftarah for the parashah is Isaiah 54:11–55:5. The haftarah is the third in the cycle of seven haftarot of consolation after Tisha B'Av, leading up to Rosh Hashanah.

In some congregations, when Re'eh falls on 29 Av, and thus coincides with Shabbat Machar Chodesh (as it does in 2025), the haftarah is 1 Samuel 20:18–42. In other congregations, when Re'eh coincides with Shabbat Machar Chodesh, the haftarah is not changed to 1 Samuel 20:18–42 (the usual haftarah for Shabbat Machar Chodesh), but is kept as it would be in a regular year at Isaiah 54:11–55:5.

When Re'eh falls on 30 Av and thus coincides with Shabbat Rosh Chodesh (as it does in 2029), the haftarah is changed to Isaiah 66:1–23. In those years, the regular haftarah for Re'eh (Isaiah 54:11–55:5) is pushed off two weeks later, to Parashat Ki Teitzei (which in those years falls on 14 Elul), as the haftarot for Re'eh and Ki Teitzei are positioned next to each other in Isaiah.
