= 1590 in music =

== Events ==
- October 16 – Carlo Gesualdo, Italian composer of madrigals, murders his wife and her lover in flagrante delicto.
- Approximate peak year of the late Italian madrigal style, as represented by Gesualdo, Luzzaschi, Monteverdi, Marenzio, Monte and others.
- The serpent is invented by Canon Edmé Guillaume in Auxerre, France – it was a common instrument in Western European churches for the next several hundred years.
- Baldassare Donato becomes maestro di cappella at St. Mark's in Venice, taking over on the death of Gioseffo Zarlino.
- Claudio Monteverdi, Italian composer, is engaged as string player at court of Duke Vincenzo Gonzaga at Mantua.
- Emilio de' Cavalieri, Italian composer, produces Tasso's Aminto, likely with his own music, for the Medici, at Carnival in Florence.
- Giovanni Gabrieli arranges the posthumous publication of works by his uncle Andrea Gabrieli, in Venice.

== Publications ==
- Gregor Aichinger – Sacrae cantiones... (Venice: Angelo Gardano), also includes some madrigals
- Blasius Amon – Sacrae cantiones... (Munich: Adam Berg)
- Felice Anerio – First book of madrigals for six voices (Venice: Ricciardo Amadino)
- Giammateo Asola – Vespertina omnium solemnitatum psalmodia for twelve voices (Venice: Ricciardo Amadino), also includes two Magnificats, a Salve Regina, a mass, and five laudi
- Paolo Bellasio – First book of madrigals for six voices (Venice: Angelo Gardano)
- Valerio Bona – Litaniae et aliae laudes B. Mariae Virginis (Litanies and other laudas of the Blessed Virgin Mary) for four voices, Simon Tini ed. (Milan: Francesco Tini)
- Giovanni Croce
  - First book of madrigals for six voices (Venice: Giacomo Vincenti)
  - First book of Mascarate piacevole et ridicolose per il carnevale for four, five, six, seven, and eight voices (Venice: Giacomo Vincenti)
- Girolamo Dalla Casa – The second book of madrigals for five voices (Venice: Ricciardo Amadino)
- Giovanni Gabrieli publishes works in the cori spezzati style, in Venice.
- Jacobus Gallus
  - Opus musicum, volume 4 (Prague: Georg Nigrinus)
  - Harmoniarum moralium for four voices, book 2 & 3 (Prague: Georg Nigrinus)
- Hans Leo Hassler – Canzonette for four voices (Nuremberg: Katharina Gerlach)
- Paolo Isnardi – First book of masses for six voices (Venice: heirs of Girolamo Scotto)
- Orlande de Lassus, Franco-Flemish composer – Neue teutsche, unnd etliche frantzösische Gesäng for six voices (Munich: Adam Berg)
- Cristofano Malvezzi – Second book of madrigals for five voices (Venice: Giacomo Vincenti)
- Tiburtio Massaino – Third book of motets for five voices (Venice: Angelo Gardano)
- Philippe de Monte
  - Third book of madrigali spirituali for six voices (Venice: Angelo Gardano)
  - Fourteenth book of madrigals for five voices (Venice: Angelo Gardano)
- Claudio Monteverdi – Il secondo libro de madrigali a cinque voci di Claudio Monteverde Cremonese discepolo del Sig.r Ingegneri (Second book of madrigals for five voices) (Venice: Angelo Gardano)
- Giovanni Pierluigi da Palestrina – Fifth book of masses for four, five, and six voices (Rome: Giacomo Bericchia for Francesco Coattino)
- David Palladius
  - Nuptiales cantiones, a book of wedding music, published in Wittenberg by Johann Franck, printed by Matthäus Welack
  - Ein neue Lied dem Hochwirden in Gott..., published in Magdeburg by Johann Franck
- Andreas Pevernage
  - Second book of chansons for five voices (Antwerp: Christophe Plantin)
  - Third book of chansons for five voices (Antwerp: Christophe Plantin)
- Orfeo Vecchi – Masses, Sunday Vespers psalms, Magnificat, motets, and polyphonic psalms for eight voices (Milan: Francesco & the heirs of Simon Tini)
- Orazio Vecchi publishes a book of motets for 10 voices, in Venice.
- Thomas Watson – The first sett, Of Italian Madrigalls Englished, published in London.

== Births ==
- July 3 – Lucrezia Orsina Vizzana, singer, organist and composer (d. 1662)
- probable
  - Manuel Machado, composer (d. 1646)
  - Johann Schop, violinist and composer (d. 1667)
  - Loreto Vittori, Italian composer (d. 1670)
  - Caterina Assandra, Italian composer (died c. 1618)

== Deaths ==
- January 20 – Giambattista Benedetti, Italian scientist and music theorist (born 1530)
- February 4 – Gioseffo Zarlino, Italian music theorist and composer, maestro di cappella at St. Mark's in Venice (born 1517)
- April 30 – Giovanni Maria de Rossi (born c. 1522)
- September 20
  - Lodovico Agostini, Italian composer (born 1534)
  - Ascanio Trombetti, Italian composer (born 1544)
- probable – Maddalena Casulana, Italian lutenist, singer and composer (born c 1544)
