= Giovanni Rossi =

Giovanni Rossi may refer to:

== Academics ==
- Giovanni Bernardo De Rossi (1742–1831), Italian Hebraist
- Giovanni Battista de Rossi (archaeologist) (1822–1894), Italian archaeologist

== Arts and entertainment ==
- Giovanni Rossi (composer) (1828–1886), Italian composer, conductor, organist, music educator, and conservatory director
- Giovanni Rossi (music publisher) (died 1595), Italian music publisher
- Giovanni Antonio de' Rossi (1616–1695), Italian architect of the Baroque
- Giovanni Battista Rossi (fl. 1585 – c. 1628), Italian composer, music theorist, and member of the Somaschi Fathers
- Giovanni Giacomo de Rossi (1627–1691), Italian engraver and printer, active in Rome
- Giovanni Maria de Rossi (c. 1522–1590), Italian composer, singer, organist, and Roman Catholic priest
- Giovanni "Gio" Rossi, fictional character on the ABC television series Ugly Betty

== Religion ==
- Giovanni de Rossi (bishop) (died 1667), Roman Catholic Bishop of Ossero and Bishop of Chiron
- Giovanni Battista de' Rossi (priest) (1698–1764), Italian Roman Catholic priest

== Other ==
- Giovanni Rossi (anarchist) (1856–1943), Italian anarchist
- Giovanni Rossi (bicycle racer) (1926–1983), Swiss road bicycle racer
- Giovanni de' Rossi (1431–1502), Italian condottiero and the fifth count of San Secondo
