= 1945–1972 Llanelli Borough Council elections =

Welsh local government elections

Llanelly Borough Council was a local authority created in 1913 when the existing Urban District Council achieved borough status. The Council consisted of 24 members, eighteen of whom were elected councillors and the remaining six were aldermen. The councillors were elected on a triennial cycle, with a third of councillors retiring each year. Aldermen were elected for a six-year term from within the council membership. It was renamed Llanelli Borough Council in the 1960s.

== 1945 Llanelly Borough Council election ==
At the first post-war election, eight seats were contested, as six councillors retired with two vacancies to be filled. In addition, the term of three aldermen elected in 1935 came to an end, although H.W. Bowen (Lab) had recently died and Daniel Roberts (Ind) decided not to stand.

Labour candidates won a sweeping victory, taking seven of the eight seats and gaining a majority on the borough council for the first time. Three Independents co-opted to fill vacancies during the war years were defeated, as was Alderman W.E. Davies in Ward Two.

=== Ward One (two seats) ===
Ward One 1945
Party	Candidate	Votes	%	±%
Labour	Reg John	2,864		
Independent	Dr H.D. Llewellyn*	2,579		
Labour	T.M. Price	2,105		
Labour	D.J. Davies	1,925		
Independent	Dan Williams*	1,789		
Independent	D. Cecil Williams	1,675		
Communist	Enoch Collins	1,111		
Independent	W. Hughes	984		

=== Ward Two (two seats) ===
Ward Two 1945
Party	Candidate	Votes	%	±%
Labour	D.J. Joseph	3,903		
Labour	W. Douglas Hughes*	3,744		
Independent	W.E. Davies**	1,855		

=== Ward Three (two seats) ===
Ward Three 1945
Party	Candidate	Votes	%	±%
Labour	William Thomas	1,875		
Labour	W.E. Payne	1,818		
Labour	John Griffiths*	1,779		
Independent	Ted Howells	1,066		
Communist	Ernest Leyshon	1,027		
Independent	D.J. Evans	544		
Independent	J. Sidney Jones*	538		
Independent	W.R. Davies	370		
Independent	J. Stanley Davies	270		
Independent	J. Bradbury	44		

=== By-elections ===
At the statutory meeting, Dr H.D. Llewellyn (Ind), Douglas Hughes (Lab) and John Griffiths (Lab) were elected aldermen. This led to considerable criticism over the alleged reaction of the seniority principles which had previously been unofficially adopted when selecting aldermen

At the by-elections which followed, much press attention focused on the decision of the British Legion to run candidates, after they were challenged to do so at a council meeting by Labour members. While the contest was close in Ward One, Labour nevertheless took all three seats, thus consolidating their majority.

=== Ward 1 by-election (one seat) ===
Ward 1 by-election 1945
Party	Candidate	Votes	%	±%
Labour	D.J. Davies	1,550		
British Legion	William Hughes	1,451		

=== Ward 2 by-election (one seat) ===
Ward 2 by-election 1945
Party	Candidate	Votes	%	±%
Labour	D.J. Williams	2,177		
British Legion	D.I. Morris	944		

=== Ward 3 by-election (one seat) ===
Ward 3 by-election 1945
Party	Candidate	Votes	%	±%
Labour	D.J. Rowlands	1,374		
Independent	Fred Howells	901		
Independent	C.R.G. Purrier	81		

== 1946 Llanelly Borough Council election ==
All three wards were contested by two Independent, two Labour and two Communist candidates. The Independents gained four seats; three at the expense of Labour and the fourth by ousting the sole remaining Communist councillor. Defeated Labour candidates included sitting county councillor David Richards.

=== Ward One (two seats) ===
Ward One 1946
Party	Candidate	Votes	%	±%
Independent	John Zammit	2,182		
Independent	D.J. Edmunds	1,990		
Labour	David L. Richards*	1,840		
Labour	T.M. Price*	1,748		
Communist	Enoch Collins	627		
Communist	Ivor Davies	369		

=== Ward Two (two seats) ===
Ward Two 1946
Party	Candidate	Votes	%	±%
Independent	Sidney C. Ellis	2,512		
Labour	W.J. Davies*	2,085		
Labour	Frank Griffiths	1,986		
Independent	Glyn Thomas	1,923		
Communist	T.R. Evans	469		
Communist	E.G. Watkeys	400		

=== Ward Three (two seats) ===
Ward Three 1946
Party	Candidate	Votes	%	±%
Independent	Ted Howells	1,115		
Labour	D.J. Rowlands*	1,061		
Communist	Brin James*	946		
Labour	A.J. Evans	886		
Independent	Handel C. Rogers	837		
Communist	Iorwerth Roberts	526		

== 1947 Llanelly Borough Council election ==
Labour captured all six seats, with two former mayors among the defeated Independent candidates. Llanelli was reported to be the only borough in the United Kingdom where Labour gained control.

=== Ward One (two seats) ===
Ward One 1947
Party	Candidate	Votes	%	±%
Labour	T. Glanville Williams	2,522		
Labour	David L. Richards	2,395		
Independent	J. Kendrick Clement	2,327		
Independent	William Hughes*	2,297		

=== Ward Two (two seats) ===
Ward Two 1947
Party	Candidate	Votes	%	±%
Labour	Daniel Rees*	3,534		
Labour	Frank Griffiths	3,116		
Independent	H. Beaton	1,877		
Independent	Evan Jones	1,799		

=== Ward Three (two seats) ===
Ward Three 1947
Party	Candidate	Votes	%	±%
Labour	Glyn W. Every	1,468		
Labour	Alf Evans	1,414		
Independent	A.H. Olive*	1,401		
Communist	Brinley James*	731		
Communist	Enoch Collins	645		
Independent	Theo Jenkins*	626		
Independent	J. Bradbury	52		

== 1949 Llanelly Borough Council election ==
Following a decision to move the municipal election from the autumn to the spring throughout England and Wales, the scheduled 1948 elections were postponed. For the first time, no Independent candidates were nominated in two of the wards, resulting in an unopposed return in Ward Three. Three Independent aldermen stood down but they all decided not to seek re-election. In addition, Reginald John B.Sc., headmaster of Lakefield School, stood down as a Labour councillor on health grounds.

The election resulted in one Independent gain, as Henry Richards, unsuccessful at a recent County by-election, gained a seat in Ward One.

=== Ward One (two seats) ===
Ward One 1949
Party	Candidate	Votes	%	±%
Independent	Henry Richards	1,971		
Labour	D. Joseph Davies*	1,927		
Labour	Evan Jones	1,908		
Independent	William Hughes	1,903		
Communist	Enoch Collins	159		

=== Ward Two (two seats) ===
Ward Two 1949
Party	Candidate	Votes	%	±%
Labour	D.J. Joseph	2,612		
Labour	D.J. Williams	2,471		
Communist	E.G. Watkeys	226		

=== Ward Three (two seats) ===
Ward Three 1949
Party	Candidate	Votes	%	±%
Labour	W.E. Payne*	Unopposed		
Labour	Gwilym Thomas*	Unopposed		

=== By-elections ===
At the statutory meeting on 23 May, Labour councillors D.L. Richards, Daniel Rees and Gwilym Thomas were elected aldermen.

At the by-elections, Labour won all three seats leaving the party with eighteen members on the borough council as opposed to six Independents.

=== Ward 1 by-election (one seat) ===
Ward 1 by-election 1949
Party	Candidate	Votes	%	±%
Labour	Evan Jones	1,330		
Independent	William Hughes	1,284		

=== Ward 2 by-election (one seat) ===
Ward 2 by-election 1949
Party	Candidate	Votes	%	±%
Labour	William Davies	Unopposed		

=== Ward 3 by-election (one seat) ===
Ward 3 by-election 1949
Party	Candidate	Votes	%	±%
Labour	William Nurse	960		
Communist	W.T. Davies	143		

== 1950 Llanelly Borough Council election ==
While four of the retiring members were Independents, Labour gained a seat.

=== Ward One (two seats) ===
Ward One 1950
Party	Candidate	Votes	%	±%
Independent	John Zammit*	2,968		
Labour	R.E. Bonnell	2,505		
Independent	Emrys Evans	2,298		
Labour	E.G. Wilkinson	1,939		
Communist	Enoch Collins	268		

=== Ward Two (two seats) ===
Ward Two 1950
Party	Candidate	Votes	%	±%
Independent	Sidney C. Ellis*	2,596		
Labour	D.D. Williams	2,238		
Labour	Arthur W.J. Francis	2,033		
Independent	H. Beaton	1,860		
Communist	E.G. Watkeys	250		

=== Ward Three (two seats) ===
Ward Three 1946
Party	Candidate	Votes	%	±%
Independent	Fred Howells*	1,570		
Labour	D.J. Rowlands*	1,397		
Labour	S.I. Thomas	1,238		
Communist	W.T. Davies	241		

== 1951 Llanelly Borough Council election ==
Labour defended all six seats but lost one to the Independents.

=== Ward One (two seats) ===
Ward One 1951
Party	Candidate	Votes	%	±%
Labour	T. Glanville Williams*	2,584		
Independent	Emrys Evans	2,386		
Labour	Evan Jones*	2,395		
Independent	Menna Davies	1,974		
Communist	Sidney Thomas	290		

=== Ward Two (two seats) ===
Ward Two 1950
Party	Candidate	Votes	%	±%
Labour	Frank Griffiths*	3,151		
Labour	William Davies*	2,839		
Independent	Eleanor Thomas	2,326		
Independent	Mervyn Griffiths	2,021		

=== Ward Three (two seats) ===
Ward Three 1950
Party	Candidate	Votes	%	±%
Labour	Glyn W. Every*	1,846		
Labour	Alf Evans	1,697		
Independent	John Owen	1,216		
Communist	M.E. Jones	135		
