= Trombetti =

Trombetti is a surname of Italian origin. People with that name include:

- Alfredo Trombetti (1866–1929), Italian linguist
- Ascanio Trombetti (1544–1590), Italian composer
- Luisa Trombetti (born 1993), Italian swimmer who competed at the 2016 Summer Olympics
