= Camillo Cortellini =

Italian composer

Camillo Cortellini (24 January 1561–12/13 February 1630) was an Italian composer, singer, and violinist.

== Biography ==
Cortellini was born in Bologna, and was the son of the composer Gaspare "the viola" Cortellini. In following his father's profession, Camillo was nicknamed "violino." His first musical education was received from his father who was employed at the Concerto Palatino. He then was taught by Alfonso Ganass].

On 26 February 1577, Cortellini succeeded his father in the Concerto della Signoria. In the same month, Cortellini was also admitted as the second soprano cornett player for the group Concerto Palatino, where he would later come back and direct in 1613.

In 1593, he was elected cantor at the prestigious chapel of San Petronio Basilica, where he worked until his death in 1630. From 1582 to 1599, Cortellini was in and out of works with the Capella Musicale of San Petrinio ("San Petronio Basilica") and served there as a singer and trombonist from 1600 to 1629 with a break between 1607 and 1610. In 1626, Cortellini became a member of Accademia Filarmonica di Bologna ("philharmonic academy of Bologna").

In 1583, he released his first publication where he labeled himself as "Musico Dell'Illustrissima Signoria di Bologna" ("the most illustrious lordship of Bologna"). His first publications were secular music, which included three books of madrigals between 1583 and 1586. The second of these, Il secondo libro di madrigali a cinque voci (1584), was the first music to be published in Bologna using movable metal type; an innovation done by the publisher Giovanni Rossi.

Cortellini's printed works also include two books of psalm settings, a set of eight Magnificat settings, and 3 books of masses. Cortellini was the first composer in Bologna to publish concerted Masses with his Second Book of Masses in 1617.

== Works ==
- Primo Libro de’ Madrigali a 5 e 6 voci. Ferrara, Baldini, 1583 (preserved incomplete)
- Secondo Libro de’ Madrigali a 5 voci. Bologna, Rossi, 1584 (preserved incomplete)
- Terzo Libro de’ Madrigali a 5 voci. Ferrara, Baldini, 1586
- Salmi a 6 voi. Venice, Vincenti, 1595
- Salmi a 8 voci e organo per i Vespri di tutto l’anno. Venice, Vincenti, 1606
- 8 Magnificat a 6 voci. Venice, Vincenti, 1607
- Messe a 4, 5, 6 e 8 voci e organo sui toni ecclesiastici. Venice, Vincenti, 1609
- Laetanie della Beata Vergine a 5, 6, 7 e 8 voci. Venezia, Vincenti, 1615
- Messe concertate a 8 voci. Venice, Vincenti, 1617
- Messe concertate a 8 voci. Venice, Vincenti, 1626
- Azioni rappresentate in musica per la Festa della Porchetta di Bologna. 1627 (only libretto survives)
