= Court of the Women =

Outer forecourt of the Temples in Jerusalem

The Court of the Women (Hebrew: עזרת הנשים Ezrat HaNashim or עזרת נשים Ezrat Nashim) was the outer forecourt of the Temples in Jerusalem into which women were permitted to enter. The court was also known as the "middle court", as it stood between the Court of the Gentiles and the Court of Israel, i.e. the Court of the Men. The Women's Court existed in the Second Temple, and there are sources which say it existed even in the Tabernacle at Shiloh and in the First Temple. Second Chronicles 20:5 states that King Jehoshaphat stood "... in the house of the Lord before the new court." a court identified by the Talmud as the Court of the Women. In contemporary synagogues, this term is used for the area allocated to women for the purpose of prayer.

== Name ==
The reason for calling it the Court of the Women was that, although it served both men and women equally, during the Simchat Beit Hashoeva (Water Drawing Festival) special balconies were installed for the women to stand upon. The gemara in Tractate Sukkah states that "initially, women would stand on the inside of the Court of the Women, closer to the Sanctuary to the west, and the men were on the outside in the courtyard and on the rampart. And they would come to conduct themselves with inappropriate levity in each other’s company, as the men needed to enter closer to the altar when the offerings were being sacrificed and as a result they would mingle with the women. Therefore, the Sages instituted that the women should sit on the outside and the men on the inside, and still they would come to conduct themselves with inappropriate levity. Therefore, they instituted a ruling, in the interest of complete separation, that the women would sit above and the men below" (Sukkah 51b).

== Area and structure ==
The area of the Women's Court was 135 by 135 cubits (61.72 x 61.72 meters). On the western side, between the chambers, semicircular steps were built, each one at a height and width of half a cubit (0.23 meters) which led to the court and served the Levites as a platform to stand upon while singing and playing during the Simchat Beit Hashoeva. According to Jewish tradition in the Mishnah, the Songs of Ascents (or Songs of Degrees) in Psalms (Chapters 120–134 -- 15 psalms) were sung by the Levites on these fifteen steps (m. Middot 2:5; m. Sukkah 5:4).

During the Sukkot holiday, balconies were built that stood out from the walls and the women came by stairs, where the women who came to participate would stand during the holiday. In addition, many lamps were erected during Sukkot to illuminate the people celebrating at night, which the priests would light before the celebrations began.

== Use ==
The use of the Court of the Women, apart from the regular use of the priests and the people that came to the house of God, included the celebrations of Simchat Beit Hashoeva, and the assembly of the people during the Hakhel (Deuteronomy 31:12). A special wooden platform would be built for the king's seat who read the Torah to the people.

== Holiness ==
The Court of the Women was considered more holy than the surface of the terrace (or the Chel) that surrounded it. because any person who was newly immersed, that is, a person who had been immersed that same day, was forbidden to enter there. This law did not come from the Torah but from a decree by Jehoshaphat the king of Judah to the people, and therefore if they enter its area on the day they are immersed they are not obligated to bring the sin offering.

== Chambers ==
In each corner of The Court of Women was a roofless chamber 40 meters long and wide. Most commentators believe that the chambers were within the Court of the Women. Rabbi Asher ben Jehiel was of the opinion that the chambers were in fact connected to it from the outside.
The Chamber of Wood was in the northeast corner, and is where the priests checked the firewood that was to be burnt on the altar for worm-eaten wood. According to one Talmudic tradition, the Ark of the Covenant was hidden beneath the floor of this chamber. (Tractate Shekalim 6:2)
Chamber of the Nazarites - was in the southeast corner. Nazarites, at the end of the period of their Nazarite vow, would shave off their hair that had grown long and threw it into the fire under the vat that cooked the meat of their peace offering sacrifice.
The Chamber of Oils (or the Chamber of the House of Oils) - in the south-western corner, where the oil and wine were stored for the purposes of the Temple, such as lighting the Menorah
The Lepers Chamber, In the northwestern corner, had a mikvah where the lepers who had come to sacrifice the offerings that they were commanded to sacrifice on the day of their purification were immersed There too, they would cook some of the offerings after they were sacrificed.
Two other chambers, the entrances of which was in the Court of the Women, were the two Chambers of Musical Instruments, which served as the storehouse for the Levites. The chambers themselves were not in the Court of Women but rather was dug beneath the floor of the Court of the Israelites, but the entrances to these chambers were within the Court of Women, on either side of the steps leading up to the Nicanor Gate. The dimensions of these chambers are unknown.

== Court of the Women according to Josephus ==
According to the historian Flavius Josephus in his book The Wars of the Jews (Book 5, chapter 5), the Court of the Women had three gates, one from every direction. In his book "Against Apion" (Book 5, chapter 8), the Court of the Women was described as a courtyard that allowed both sexes to mix:
"Into the first court everybody was allowed to go, even foreigners, and none but women, during their courses, were prohibited to pass through it; all the Jews went into the second court, as well as their wives, when they were free from all uncleanness; into the third court (The Court of the Israelites) went in the Jewish men, when they were clean and purified.

== See also ==
- Women in the Bible
- Bat-Kohen, the daughter of a priest or kohen
- Women of the Wall, modern movement
