= Ashkar-Gilson Manuscript =

The Ashkar-Gilson Manuscript is a fragment of a Torah scroll, dated to the 7th century CE, containing a portion of Shemot (Book of Exodus). The section is a crucial text that displays the unique layout of Shirat HaYam (The Song of the Sea). The official name of the fragment is MS Durham, Duke University, Ashkar-Gilson #2.

Ashkar-Gilson #2 was bought in Beirut, Lebanon in 1972 by Fuad Ashkar and Albert Gilson, although it is believed that it may have come from the Cairo Genizah. Ashkar and Gilson donated the manuscript to Duke University. In 2007, the university lent the piece to the Israel Museum in Jerusalem, where it was displayed in the Shrine of the Book. During its exhibition at the museum, the manuscript attracted the attention of two Israeli scholars, Mordechay Mishor and Edna Engel. Close examination of the manuscript revealed that the fragment was the continuation of the previously uncovered London Manuscript, containing the passages of Exodus 9:18–13:2. Additional fragments of the same scroll were identified by Mordechai Veintrob. They were discussed by Paul Sanders, who argues that the relationship between the scroll and the Aleppo Codex is remarkably strong.
