= Song of the Sea =

Poem in the Book of Exodus

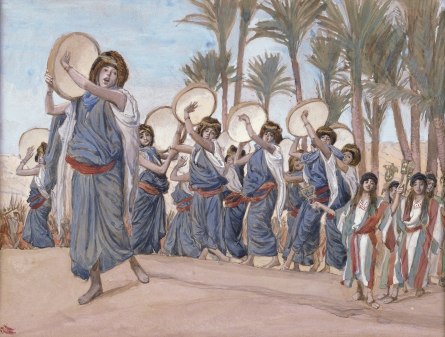
The Songs of Joy (watercolor circa 1896–1902 by James Tissot)

The Song of the Sea (Biblical Hebrew: שִׁירַת הַיָּם, romanized: širaṯ hayyām), also known as Az Yashir Moshe (אָז יָשִׁיר מֹשֶׁה "then Moses will sing") and Mi Chamocha (מִי־כָמֹכָה "Who is like You?"), is a poem that appears in the Hebrew Bible in the Book of Exodus 15:1–18. Its first two verses are repeated in verses 20 and 21, there said to be sung by Miriam and other Israelite women. The Song of the Sea was sung by the Israelites after their crossing the Red Sea in safety and celebrates their freedom after generations of slavery and oppression by the Egyptians.

The poem is included in Jewish prayer books (siddurim) and recited daily during Shaharit. The poem forms part of the sixteenth weekly Torah portion, parashat Beshalach. The Shabbat on which it is read is known as 'Shabbat of Song' (Hebrew: שַׁבַּת שִׁירָה, romanized: Shabbat Shirah). It is one of only two sections of the Torah scroll written in a layout different from simple columns. The other section is the Song of Moses at the end of Deuteronomy, in the 53rd weekly portion (parashat Ha'azinu).

The poem also comprises the first hymn of the Eastern Orthodox canon, in which it is known as the Song of Moses. It is also used in the Catholic Church and other Christian liturgies the Easter Vigil, when the salvation history as believed by Christians is recounted. The Christian traditions follow Revelation 15:3 by calling it the "Song of Moses" (not to be confused with the Song of Moses in Deuteronomy).

== Origin ==
The Song of the Sea is noted for its archaic language, written in a form of Hebrew much older than that of the rest of Exodus. Some scholars consider it the oldest surviving text describing the Exodus, dating to the pre-monarchic period. An alternative view is that it was deliberately written in an archaic style, a known literary device. As such, proposed dates for its composition range from the 13th to the 5th century BCE.

A study by Joshua Berman found that the Exodus sea account is an appropriation of the Poem of Pentaur on the Battle of Kadesh of Ramesses II based on a close textual analysis of both works. Berman asserts that the appropriation could have deliberate satirical intent, as part of an ideological battle with Ramesses II. Berman notes that the Kadesh illustrations also include an appearance of an Ark of the Covenant and Tabernacle, which are an Egyptian mobile altar, which traditionally were also golden boxes with winged Isis and Nephthys facing each other and a space for a god's cartouche to be seated between them.

== Page layout ==
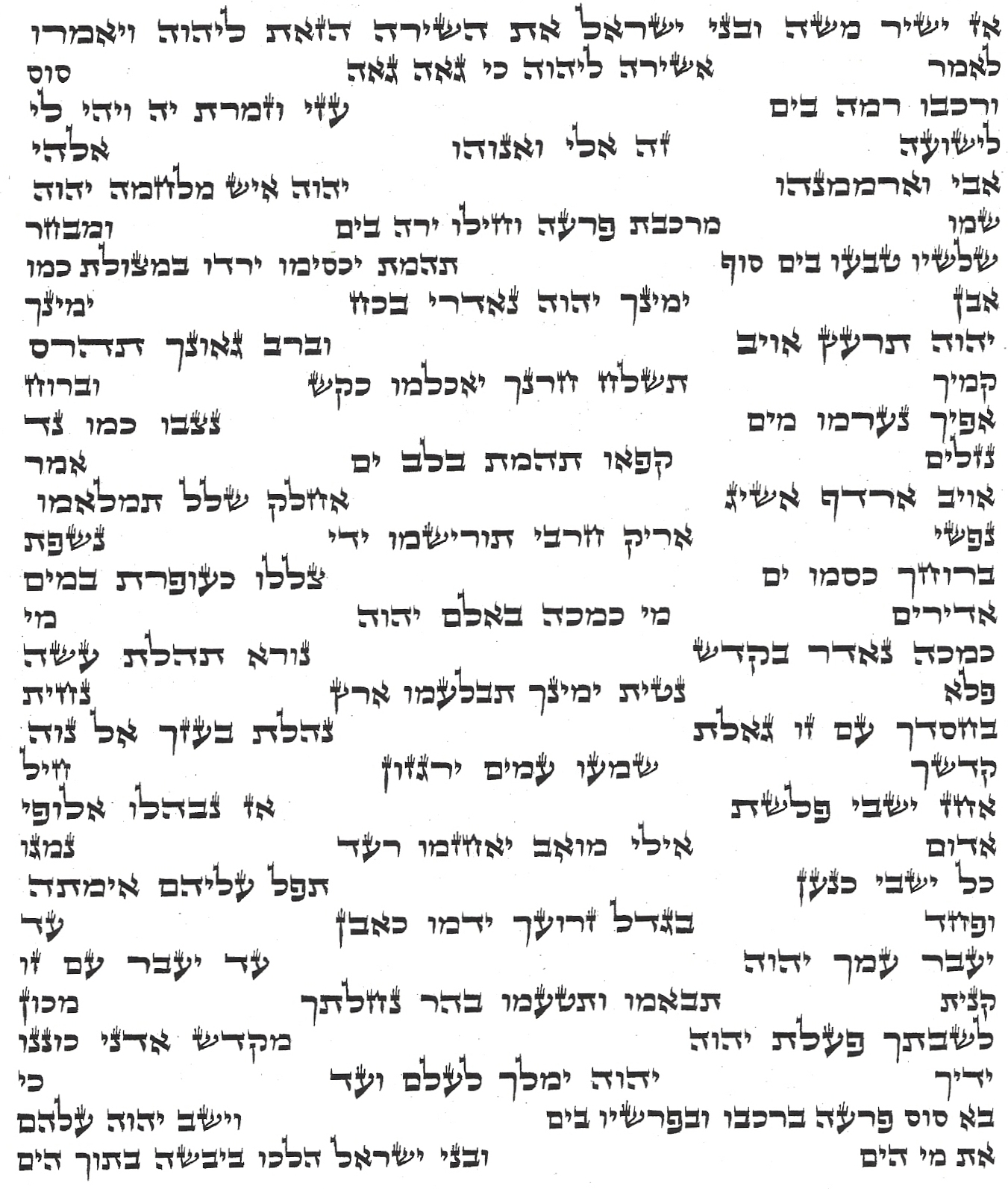
Song of the Sea from a Sefer Torah

The Ashkar-Gilson Manuscript is a fragment of a 7th century Torah scroll that contains the Song of the Sea. Some scholars have argued that the "brickwork" pattern of the Ashkar-Gilson version shows that the Masoretes accurately copied earlier manuscripts. This pattern was not used in the Dead Sea Scrolls. A similar pattern is used in modern Torah scrolls, and the Ashkenazi and Sepharadi Torah scrolls differ from the Yemenite scrolls in the arrangement of the very last line.

== Text ==
Masoretic Text	Transliteration	English translation (New International Version)
אָ֣ז יָשִֽׁיר־מֹשֶׁה֩ וּבְנֵ֨י יִשְׂרָאֵ֜ל אֶת־הַשִּׁירָ֤ה הַזֹּאת֙ לַֽיהוָ֔ה וַיֹּאמְר֖וּ לֵאמֹ֑ר אָשִׁ֤ירָה לַֽיהוָה֙ כִּֽי־גָאֹ֣ה גָּאָ֔ה, ס֥וּס וְרֹכְב֭וֹ רָמָ֥ה בַיָּֽם	āz yāšīr Mōše wūḆənē Yisrāʾēl eṯ-haššīrā hazzōṯ lAḏonāy wayyōmərū lēmōr āšīrā lAḏonāy kī-ḡāʾō gāʾā, sūs wərōḵəḇō rāmā ḇayyām	1 Then Moses and the Israelites sang this song to the Lord: "I will sing to the Lord, for he is highly exalted. Both horse and driver he has hurled into the sea.
עָזִּ֤י וְזִמְרָת֙ יָ֔הּ וַֽיְהִי־לִ֖י לִֽישׁוּעָ֑ה זֶ֤ה אֵלִי֙ וְאַנְוֵ֔הוּ אֱלֹהֵ֥י אָבִ֖י וַאֲרֹמְמֶֽנְהוּ	ʿozzī wəzimrāṯ Yāh wayəhīlī līšūʿā ze ēlī wəʾanwēhū ĕlōhē āḇī waʾarōməmenhū	2 "The Lord is my strength and my defense; he has become my salvation. He is my God, and I will praise him, my father’s God, and I will exalt him.
יְהוָ֖ה אִ֣ישׁ מִלְחָמָ֑ה יְהוָ֖ה שְׁמֽוֹ	Aḏonāy īš milḥāmā Aḏonāy šəmō	3 The Lord is a warrior; the Lord is his name.
מַרְכְּבֹ֥ת פַּרְעֹ֛ה וְחֵיל֭וֹ יָרָ֣ה בַיָּ֑ם וּמִבְחַ֥ר שָֽׁלִשָׁ֖יו טֻבְּע֥וּ בְיַם־סֽוּף	markəḇōṯ Parʿō wəḥēlō yārā ḇayyām ūmiḇḥar šālīšāw ṭubbəʿū ḇəYam-Sūp̄	4 Pharaoh’s chariots and his army he has hurled into the sea. The best of Pharaoh’s officers are drowned in the Red Sea.
תְּהֹמֹ֖ת יְכַסְיֻ֑מוּ יָרְד֥וּ בִמְצוֹלֹ֖ת כְּמוֹ־אָֽבֶן	təhōmōṯ yəḵasyumū yārəḏū ḇimṣōlōṯ kəmō-āḇen	5 The deep waters have covered them; they sank to the depths like a stone.
יְמִֽינְךָ֣ יְהוָ֔ה נֶאְדָּרִ֖י בַּכֹּ֑חַ יְמִֽינְךָ֥ יְהוָ֖ה תִּרְעַ֥ץ אוֹיֵֽב	yəmīnəḵā Aḏonāy neddārī bakkōaḥ yəmīnəḵā Aḏonāy tīrʿaṣ ōyēḇ	6 Your right hand, Lord, was majestic in power. Your right hand, Lord, shattered the enemy.
וּבְרֹ֥ב גְּאוֹנְךָ֖ תַּהֲרֹ֣ס קָמֶ֑יךָ תְּשַׁלַּח֙ חֲרֹ֣נְךָ֔ יֹאכְלֵ֖מוֹ כַּקַּֽשׁ	ūḇərōḇ gəʾōnəḵā taharōs qāmēḵā təšallaḥ ḥarōnəḵā yōḵlēmō kaqqaš	7 "In the greatness of your majesty you threw down those who opposed you. You unleashed your burning anger; it consumed them like stubble.
וּבְר֤וּחַ אַפֶּ֙יךָ֙ נֶ֣עֶרְמוּ מַ֔יִם נִצְּב֥וּ כְמוֹ־נֵ֖ד נֹזְלִ֑ים קָֽפְא֥וּ תְהֹמֹ֖ת בְּלֶב־יָֽם	ūḇərūaḥ appēḵā neʿermū mayim niṣṣəḇū ḵəmō-nēḏ nōzəlīm qāp̄əʾū ṯəhōmōṯ bəleḇ-yām	8 By the blast of your nostrils the waters piled up. The surging waters stood up like a wall; the deep waters congealed in the heart of the sea.
אָמַ֥ר אוֹיֵ֛ב אֶרְדֹּ֥ף אַשִּׂ֖יג אֲחַלֵּ֣ק שָׁלָ֑ל תִּמְלָאֵ֣מוֹ נַפְשִׁ֔י אָרִ֣יק חַרְבִּ֔י תּוֹרִישֵׁ֖מוֹ יָדִֽי	āmar ōyēḇ erdop̄ assīḡ aḥallēq šālāl timlāʾēmō nap̄šī ārīq ḥarbī tōrīšēmō yāḏī	9 The enemy boasted, ‘I will pursue, I will overtake them. I will divide the spoils; I will gorge myself on them. I will draw my sword and my hand will destroy them.’
נָשַׁ֥פְתָּ בְרוּחֲךָ֖ כִּסָּ֣מוֹ יָ֑ם צָֽלֲלוּ֙ כַּֽעוֹפֶ֔רֶת בְּמַ֖יִם אַדִּירִֽים	nāšap̄tā ḇərūḥaḵā kissāmō yām ṣālalū kaʿōp̄ereṯ bəmayim addīrīm	10 But you blew with your breath, and the sea covered them. They sank like lead in the mighty waters.
מִֽי־כָמֹ֤כָה בָּֽאֵלִם֙ יְהוָ֔ה מִ֥י כָּמֹ֖כָה נֶאְדָּ֣ר בַּקֹּ֑דֶשׁ נוֹרָ֥א תְהִלֹּ֖ת עֹ֥שֵׂה פֶֽלֶא	mī-ḵāmōḵā bāʾēlīm Aḏonāy mī kāmōḵā neddār baqqōḏeš nōrā ṯəhillōṯ ʿōsē p̄ele	11 Who among the gods is like you, Lord? Who is like you— majestic in holiness, awesome in glory, working wonders?
נָטִ֙יתָ֙ יְמִ֣ינְךָ֔ תִּבְלָעֵ֖מוֹ אָֽרֶץ	nāṭīṯā yəmīnəḵā tiḇlāʿēmō āreṣ	12 "You stretch out your right hand, and the earth swallows your enemies.
נָחִ֥יתָ בְחַסְדְּךָ֖ עַם־ז֣וּ גָּאָ֑לְתָּ נֵהַ֥לְתָּ בְעָזְּךָ֖ אֶל־נְוֵ֥ה קָדְשֶֽׁךָ	nāḥīṯā ḇəḥasdəḵā ʿam-zū gāʾālətā nēhaltā ḇəʿāzzəḵā el-nəwē qoḏəšeḵā	13 In your unfailing love you will lead the people you have redeemed. In your strength you will guide them to your holy dwelling.
שָֽׁמְע֥וּ עַמִּ֖ים יִרְגָּז֑וּן חִ֣יל אָחַ֔ז יֹשְׁבֵ֖י פְּלָֽשֶׁת	šāməʿū ʿammīm yirgāzūn ḥīl āḥaz yōšəḇē Pəlāšeṯ	14 The nations will hear and tremble; anguish will grip the people of Philistia.
אָ֤ז נִבְהֲלוּ֙ אַלּוּפֵ֣י אֱד֔וֹם אֵילֵ֣י מוֹאָ֔ב יֹֽאחֲזֵ֖מוֹ רָ֑עַד נָמֹ֕גוּ כֹּ֖ל יֹשְׁבֵ֥י כְנָֽעַן	āz nīḇhalū allūp̄ē Ĕḏōm ēlē Mōʾāḇ yōḥazēmō rāʿaḏ nāmōḡū kōl yōšəḇē Ḵənāʿan	15 The chiefs of Edom will be terrified, the leaders of Moab will be seized with trembling, the people of Canaan will melt away;
תִּפֹּ֨ל עֲלֵיהֶ֤ם אֵימָ֙תָה֙ וָפַ֔חַד בִּגְדֹ֥ל זְרוֹעֲךָ֖ יִדְּמ֣וּ כָּאָ֑בֶן עַד־יַעֲבֹ֤ר עַמְּךָ֙ יְהוָ֔ה עַֽד־יַעֲבֹ֖ר עַם־ז֥וּ קָנִֽיתָ	tippōl ʿalēhem ēmāṯā wāp̄aḥaḏ biḡəḏōl zərōʿaḵā yiddəmū kāʾāḇen ʿaḏ-yaʿaḇōr ʿamməḵā Aḏonāy ʿaḏ-yaʿaḇōr ʿam-zū qānīṯā	16 terror and dread will fall on them. By the power of your arm they will be as still as a stone— until your people pass by, Lord, until the people you bought pass by.
תְּבִאֵ֗מוֹ וְתִטָּעֵ֙מוֹ֨ בְּהַ֣ר נַחֲלָֽתְךָ֔ מָכ֧וֹן לְשִׁבְתְּךָ֛ פָּעַ֖לְתָּ יְהוָ֑ה מִקְּדָ֕שׁ אֲדֹנָ֖י כּוֹנְנ֥וּ יָדֶֽיךָ	təḇīʾēmō wəṯīṭṭāʿēmō bəhar naḥalāṯəḵā māḵōn ləšīḇtəḵā pāʿaltā Aḏonāy mīqqəḏāš aḏōnāy kōnənū yāḏēḵā	17 You will bring them in and plant them on the mountain of your inheritance— the place, Lord, you made for your dwelling, the sanctuary, Lord, your hands established.
יְהוָ֥ה ׀ יִמְלֹ֖ךְ לְעֹלָ֥ם וָעֶֽד	Aḏonāy yīmlōḵ ləʿōlām wāʿeḏ	18 "The Lord reigns for ever and ever."
כִּ֣י בָא֩ ס֨וּס פַּרְעֹ֜ה בְּרִכְבּ֤וֹ וּבְפָרָשָׁיו֙ בַּיָּ֔ם וַיָּ֧שֶׁב יְהוָ֛ה עֲלֵהֶ֖ם אֶת־מֵ֣י הַיָּ֑ם וּבְנֵ֧י יִשְׂרָאֵ֛ל הָלְכ֥וּ בַיַּבָּשָׁ֖ה בְּתֹ֥ךְ הַיָּֽם	kī ḇā sūs Parʿō bəriḵbō ūḇəp̄ārāšāw bayyām wayyāšeḇ Aḏonāy ʿalēhem eṯ-mē hayyām wūḆənē Yisrāʾēl hāləḵū ḇayyabbāšā bəṯōḵ hayyām	19 When Pharaoh's horses, chariots and horsemen went into the sea, the Lord brought the waters of the sea back over them, but the Israelites walked through the sea on dry ground.
וַתִּקַּח֩ מִרְיָ֨ם הַנְּבִיאָ֜ה אֲח֧וֹת אַהֲרֹ֛ן אֶת־הַתֹּ֖ף בְּיָדָ֑הּ וַתֵּצֶ֤אןָ כָֽל־הַנָּשִׁים֙ אַחֲרֶ֔יהָ בְּתֻפִּ֖ים וּבִמְחֹלֹֽת	wattīqqaḥ Mīrəyām hannəḇīʾā aḥōṯ Aharōn eṯ-hattōp̄ bəyāḏā wattēṣenā ḵāl-hannāšīm aḥarēhā bəṯuppīm wūḇimḥōlōṯ	20 Then Miriam the prophet, Aaron's sister, took a timbrel in her hand, and all the women followed her, with timbrels and dancing.
וַתַּ֥עַן לָהֶ֖ם מִרְיָ֑ם שִׁ֤ירוּ לַֽיהוָה֙ כִּֽי־גָאֹ֣ה גָּאָ֔ה ס֥וּס וְרֹכְב֭וֹ רָמָ֥ה בַיָּֽם	wattaʿan lāhem Mirəyām šīrū lAḏonāy kī-gāʾō gāʾā sūs wərōḵəḇō rāmā ḇayyām	21 Miriam sang to them: Sing to the Lord, for he is highly exalted. Both horse and driver he has hurled into the sea.

== Ketuba of the Seventh Day of Pesach ==
The Ketubá del Seten Diya de Pesah (also called 'The Ketubah of the Seventh Day of Passover' כתובה ליום השביעי של פסח) is a liturgical poem in Ladino, describing Pharaoh's defeat in the Sea of Reeds. Most Jewish communities sing this poem on 21 Nisan, the seventh day of Passover. According to Jewish tradition, this is the day on which Pharaoh's army was drowned in the Sea of Reeds, and the Israelite people sang the Song of the Sea in gratitude for this victory.

Presumably, this text is called a ketuba 'marriage contract' because the relationship between God and the Jewish people is traditionally described as a marriage, and the splitting of the sea is considered to be an important event leading to that marriage, which ultimately took place 42 days later, at Mount Sinai.

A tune for the Ladino poem along with the entire text itself can be found in Isaac Levy's Anthology of Sepharadic Hazzanut.

== Musical settings ==
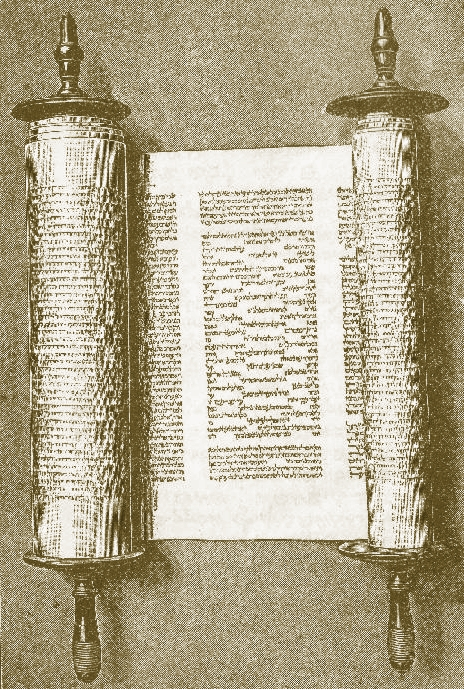
An engraving of a Torah scroll showing Exodus 15:1–19. British Library Add. MS. 4,707 (1896).

In Hebrew Cantillation, the Song is given a unique, festive tune, not bound to the ordinary trope marks.

The following settings exist for the Song of the Sea:

- Cantique de Moïse (French) Étienne Moulinié.
- Canticum Moysis (Latin) Fernando de las Infantas.
- Cantemus Domino Ascanio Trombetti.
- Part Three of Handel's 1739 oratorio Israel in Egypt, entitled Moses' Song.
- Mirjams Siegesgesang (Miriam's Song of Triumph), Op. 136, D. 942 by Franz Schubert.

Some of the song features in the 1998 animated film The Prince of Egypt. The text consists of a few selected lines and paraphrases from the Hebrew text inserted in the bridge of the song "When You Believe" (before the parting and in the reprise).

Portions of the song are paraphrased in both of the melodic and textual variations of the popular African-American gospel music song, "O Mary Don't You Weep".
