= Giovanni Rossi (music publisher) =

Giovanni Rossi (died 1595) was a 16th-century Italian music publisher. He founded his first music publishing house in Venice, Italy in 1557. The business relocated to Bologna in either 1558 or 1559. He was the first to print music in Bologna using movable metal type. After his death in 1595, his son Perseo Rossini took over the business. Composers Rossi and his son published included Camillo Cortellini, Adriano Banchieri, Ascanio Trombetti, and Ercole Porta.
