= Triennial cycle =

Three-year cycle of public readings of the Torah

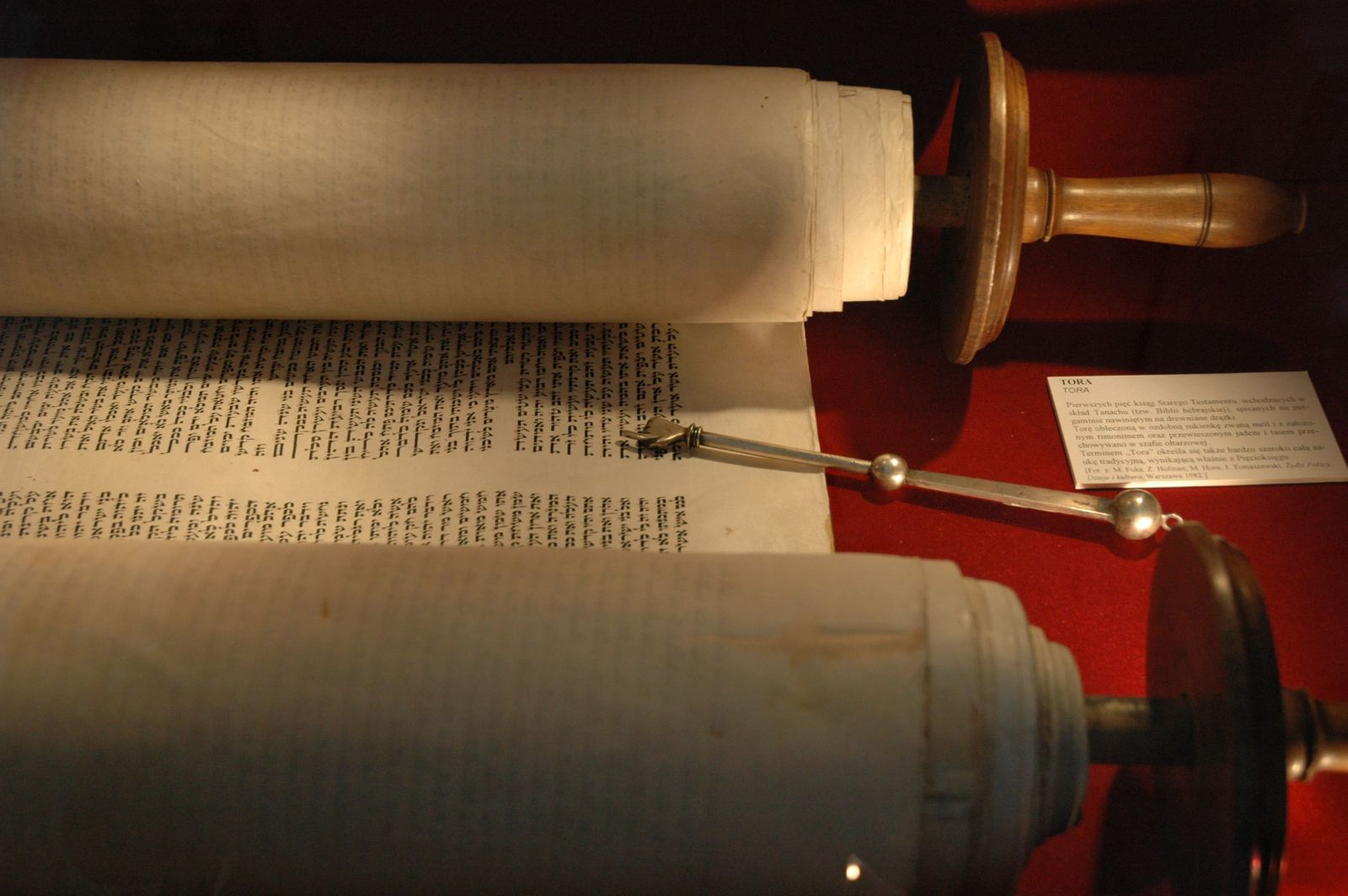
A Sefer Torah opened for liturgical use in a synagogue service

The Triennial cycle of Torah reading may refer to either

- The historical practice in ancient Israel by which the entire Torah was read in serial fashion over a three-year period, or
- The practice adopted by many Reform, Conservative, Reconstructionist and Renewal congregations starting in the 19th and 20th Century, in which the traditional weekly Torah portions are divided into thirds, and in which one third of each weekly "parashah" of the annual system is read during the appropriate week of the calendar.

== Background: Torah reading ==
The introduction of public reading of the Torah by Ezra the Scribe after the return of the Jewish people from the Babylonian Captivity is described in Nehemiah Chapter 8. Prior to Ezra, the mitzvah of Torah reading was based on the Biblical commandment of Hakhel, by which once every 7 years the entire people was to be gathered to hear Deuteronomy read to them. Traditionally, the Hakhel reading was performed by the King. Under Ezra, Torah reading became more frequent and the congregation themselves substituted for the King's role. According to one source, Ezra initiated the modern custom of reading thrice weekly in the synagogue. This reading is an obligation incumbent on the congregation, not an individual, and did not replace the Hakhel reading by the king. The reading of the Law in the synagogue can be traced to at least about the second century B.C., when the grandson of Sirach refers to it in his preface as an Egyptian practise; it must, therefore, have existed even earlier in Judea.

The annual reading cycle as practiced by the Jewish exile community in Babylonia was known by them to be different from the custom of the remaining Jews of the Land of Israel. The Babylonian Talmud refers only once to the triennial cycle: "...The people of the west (i.e. the Land of Israel) who complete the Torah in three years."

== Ancient triennial cycle ==
The Torah is divided into 54 parashot in the annual cycle. In the triennial cycle, it is divided into either 141, 154, or 167 parashot, as evidenced by scriptural references and fragments of recovered text. The practice was to read each parashah in serial order regardless of the week of the year, completing the entire Torah in three years in a linear fashion.

By the Middle Ages, the annual reading cycle was predominant, although the triennial cycle was still extant at the time, as noted by Jewish figures of the period, such as Benjamin of Tudela and Maimonides. Dating from Maimonides' codification of the parashot in his work Mishneh Torah in the 12th Century CE through the 19th Century, the majority of Jewish communities adhered to the annual cycle.

In a systematic review of the history and religious basis of the ancient and modern triennial cycles undertaken on behalf of the Conservative movement, Lionel E. Moses cites Maimonides, who in Mishneh Torah observes "The widespread practice in all of Israel is to complete the Torah in one year. There are some who complete the Torah in three years, but this is not a widespread practice."

The triennial cycle "was the practise in Israel, whereas in Babylonia the entire Pentateuch was read in the synagogue in the course of a single year." As late as 1170 Benjamin of Tudela mentioned Egyptian congregations that took three years to read the Torah.

In 1517, Daniel Bomberg (a Christian) published the first Bible with rabbinic commentary, divided into 154 sedarim.

Joseph Jacobs notes the transition from the triennial to the annual reading of the Law and the transference of the beginning of the cycle to the month of Tishri are attributed by Adolph Büchler to the influence of Rav (175–247 CE), a Babylonian Talmudist who established at Sura the systematic study of the rabbinic traditions, which, using the Mishnah as text, led to the compilation of the Talmud: "This may have been due to the smallness of the sedarim under the old system, and to the fact that people were thus reminded of the chief festivals only once in three years. It was then arranged that Deut. 28 should fall before the New-Year, and that the beginning of the cycle should come immediately after the Feast of Tabernacles. This arrangement has been retained by the Karaites and by modern congregations."

== Modern developments ==
By the early modern period, the annual cycle was universal among Jews, and there only remained "slight traces of the triennial cycle in the four special Sabbaths and in some of the passages read upon the festivals, which are frequently sections of the triennial cycle, and not of the annual one". This remains the practice in Orthodox synagogues and in many Conservative synagogues.

However, since the 19th century, many congregations in the Conservative, Reform, and (more recently) Reconstructionist and Renewal movements adopted a triennial cycle distinct from the ancient practice, by reading roughly a third of the annual cycle's sedra during the appropriate week of the year, in a manner that covers the entire Torah over the course of three years. In a 1987 responsum, the Conservative Movement's Committee on Jewish Law and Standards published a triennal calendar for congregations choosing to read Torah in that way. That calendar is not divided strictly into thirds, in order to preserve the narrative flow of the sections being read, to keep intact passages that are to be read uninterrupted, and to ensure that the subdivision into aliyot conforms with the requirements of Jewish law. This was done in order to shorten the weekly services and allow additional time for sermons, study, or discussion.

The Reconstructionist movement's prayer book, Siddur Kol Haneshamah, similarly contains a triennal Torah reading calendar.

== See also ==
- Hebrew calendar
- Torah study
