= Giovanni Maria de Rossi =

Giovanni Maria de Rossi (c. 1522 – April 30, 1590) was an Italian composer, singer, organist, and Roman Catholic priest.

== Life and career ==
Giovanni Maria de Rossi was born in Brescia, Italy in c. 1522. He was active as a musician at the Ducal Palace, Mantua during the latter half of the 16th century. There he was curator of the Duke of Mantua's collection of musical instruments. While the Council of Trent was taking place, Rossi created musical arrangements for Cardinal Ercole Gonzaga. He was appointed to the staff of the Mantua Cathedral in 1563 in the role of maestro di cappella, and while in this post became ordained as a priest. He remained at the cathedral through 1576.

In 1582 Rossi returned to the Mantua Cathedral as organist. He held that position for three years. After leaving that post he worked as a court singer until a bad case of gout forced him into retirement in the late 1580s. As a composer he wrote motets and madrigals which were published by Claudio Merulo in 1558 and 1567. His best known composition is the mass, Missa Ultimi miei sospiri.

Rossi died in Mantua on April 30, 1590.
