= Hakhel =

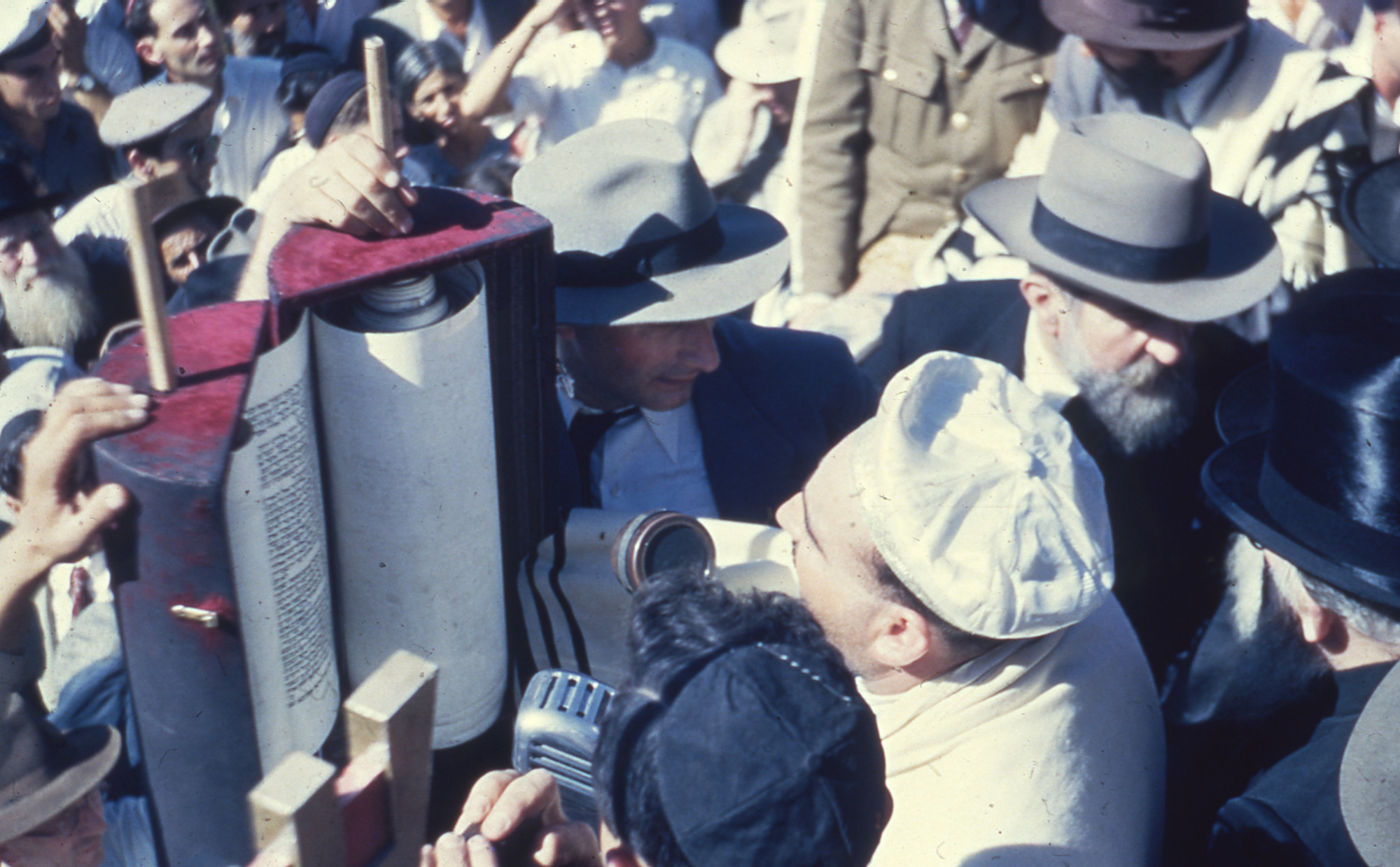

Hakhel (Hebrew: הקהל, romanized: haqhēl) is a biblical commandment to assemble all Israelite men, women and children and converts, to hear the reading of the Torah by the king of Israel once every seven years to strengthen their fear of God.

Originally this ceremony took place at the site of the Temple in Jerusalem during Sukkot in the year following a Seventh Year. According to the Mishna, the "commandment to assemble" (מצות הקהל miṣwaṯ haqhēl) was performed throughout the years of the Second Temple era and, by inference, during the First Temple era as well. The biblical mitzvah of haqhēl is only in effect when all Israelites reside in the Holy Land. However, more recently, attempts have been made to revive a symbolic form of haqhēl.

== In the Bible ==
The Hiphil verb haqhēl (Biblical Hebrew: הַקְהֵ֣ל "assemble") is used in Deuteronomy 31:10–12.

10 And Moses instructed them as follows: Every seventh year, the year set for remission, at the Feast of Booths,

11 when all Israel comes to appear before your God יהוה in the place that [God] will choose, you shall read this Teaching aloud in the presence of all Israel.

12 Gather the people—men, women, children, and the strangers in your communities—that they may hear and so learn to revere your God יהוה and to observe faithfully every word of this Teaching.

== In the Mishnah ==
According to the Mishnah, the ceremony was conducted on the first day of Chol HaMoed of Sukkot, the day after the inaugural festival day on behalf of all who participated in the Three Pilgrimage Festivals. Trumpets would sound throughout Jerusalem according to the Tosefta and a large wooden platform would be erected in the Temple in Jerusalem in the Court of the Women. The king would sit on this platform, and all in attendance would gather around him. The hazzan haknesset (החזן הכנסת, "servant of the synagogue") would hand the Book of the Law to the archisynagogue, who would hand it to the Deputy High Priest, who would give it to the High Priest of Israel, who would present it to the king. According to the Sefer ha-Chinuch, the king would accept the Torah scroll while standing but could sit while he read it aloud. The rest of Israel was required to stand, which led to Jeroboam's revolt.

The king began the reading with the same blessings over the Torah that are recited before every aliyah laTorah in synagogues today. Seven additional blessings were recited after the reading.

The reading consisted of the following sections from the Book of Deuteronomy:

1. From the beginning of the book to the Shema (6:4);
2. The second paragraph of the Shema (11:13-21);
3. "You shall surely tithe" (14:22-27);
4. "When you have finish tithing" (26:12-15);
5. The section about appointing a king (17:14-20);
6. The blessings and curses (28:1-69).

=== Why children? ===
Many commentators ask why young children were also required to attend this assembly. Eleazar ben Azariah said: “Men would come to learn and women, to listen. Why would children come? To provide a reward for those who brought them” (Hagigah 3a).

== Twentieth-century revival ==
The idea of reviving the haqhel practice in modern times was first proposed by Eliyahu David Rabinowitz-Teomim (d. 1905), who published two pamphlets on the issue, Zecher leMikdash and Dvar Be'ito.

Shmuel Salant, the Chief Rabbi of Jerusalem, would gather all the Talmud Torah students in front of the Western Wall on the first day of Chol HaMoed of Sukkot and read to them the same passages that the king would read at Hakhel.

The first official Israeli haqhel ceremony was held during Sukkot 1945, a year following the sabbatical year. A special service was held in Yeshurun Central Synagogue, after which a mass procession moved to the Western Wall, where the Torah portions were read. Similar ceremonies by Israeli government officials have been held every seven years since. The Hakhel ceremony conducted in 1994 was attended by the Chief Rabbinate of Israel, the President of Israel, and other dignitaries. The ceremony performed at the Western Wall in 2001 was led by the President of Israel, Moshe Katzav.

Menachem Mendel Schneerson, the Chabad rebbe, urged Jews everywhere that the year of hakhel has a very special energy to unite Jews, and to inspire them to strengthen their commitment to fulfilling the words of the Torah. He requested that every Jew, man, woman, and child attend the activities of Hakhel throughout this year by gathering the Jews around them and bringing them closer to Torah and fear of Heaven. There should be large and small Hakhel gatherings in synagogues and private homes throughout the Hakhel year to foster greater unity and increase Torah learning, mitzvah observance, and the giving of tzedakah. He also requested that everyone update the Hakhel activities they have done that month to one central system once a month. This should be done via filling out a "hakhel card" that has in recent years become available online as well.
