= Ascanio Trombetti =

Italian composer

Ascanio Trombetti (bapt. 27 November 1544 – 20/21 September 1590) was an Italian composer.

He was born in Bologna as a son of Astore Cavallari. In his family, the surname Trombetti was used because of the great ability of its members in playing wind instruments. His anthology Musica fatta sopra le conclusioni di legge was published by Giovanni Rossi in 1587.

In 1590, he was murdered by his lover's husband.
