= History of debt relief =

Debt relief, or debt forgiveness, has been practiced in many societies since antiquity. Periodic debt remission was institutionalised in the Ancient Near East and contributed to the stability of its societies. In ancient Greece and Rome the laws were more creditor-friendly and debt cancellation was one of the major demands of the poor, only occasionally implemented by the government. Medieval canon law contained provisions for the annulment of debts owed by borrowers in distress, which influenced modern personal bankruptcy law.

== Ancient Near East ==
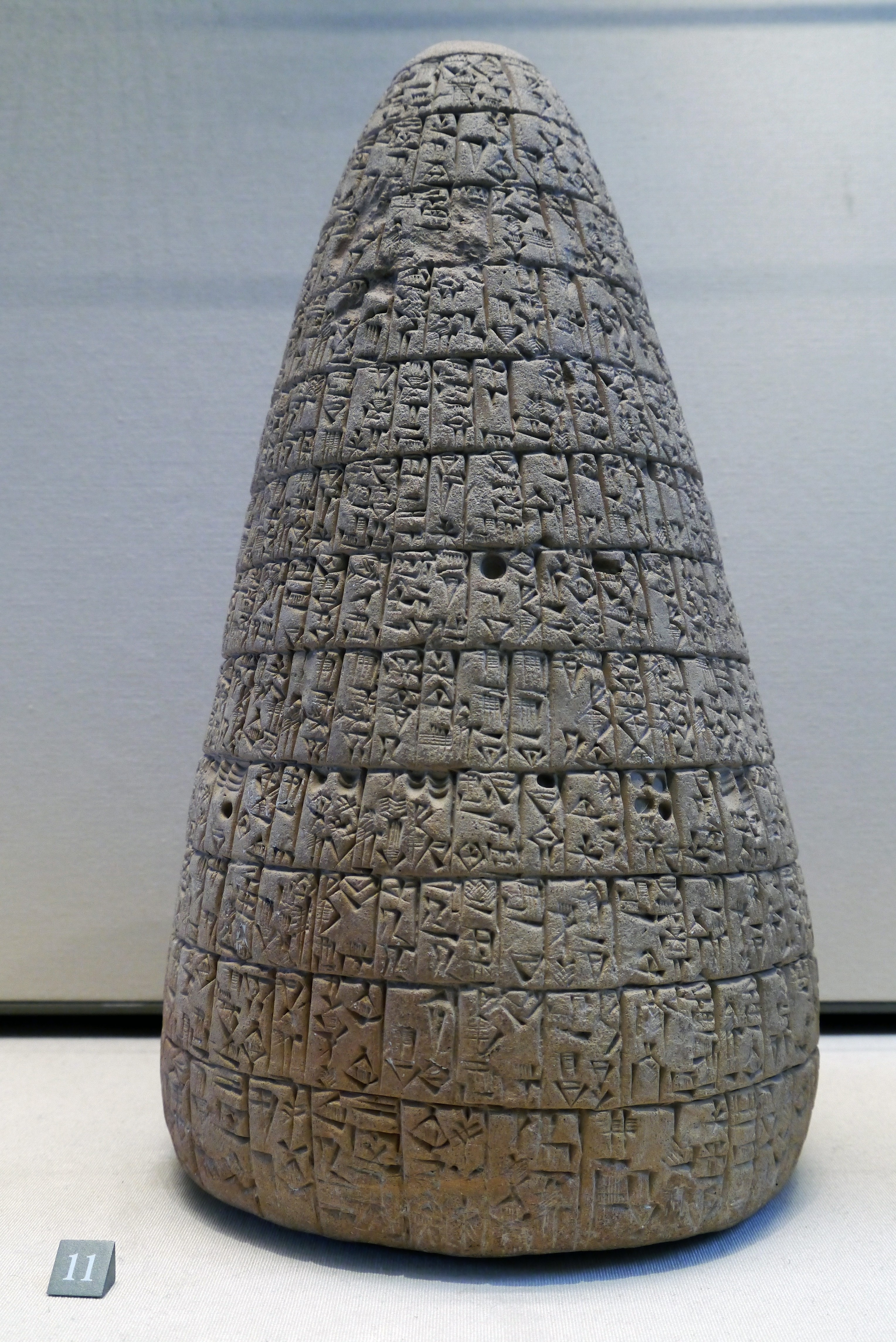
Urukagina's reform text mentions the cancelling of obligations of indentured families as part of his reforms

Debt relief existed in many societies of the Ancient Near East in the form of debt remission, whereby certain debts were declared void and the foreclosed property reverted to the original owners. Debts were often cancelled by a new ruler issuing a clean slate decree after assuming the throne or following a natural or man-made calamity. Usually only personal debt was cancelled, whereas debts incurred by merchants were unaffected.

The periodical debt remissions played a large role in the Ancient Near East. They contributed to the stability of the society. Most of the loans were taken by peasants to enable them to subsist until the next harvest, and often the land was pledged as collateral. If the borrower was unable to repay the loan the land passed to the lender, with the borrower himself becoming a bondsman. The debt remissions checked the power of elites, who would otherwise amass great fortunes of land cultivated by serfs, and ensured that enough free labourers were available to serve in the army and for public work duties.

The earliest known debt cancellation was proclaimed by Enmetena of Lagash c. 2400 BCE. Similar measures were enacted by later Sumerian, Babylonian and Assyrian rulers of Mesopotamia, where they were known as "freedom decrees" (ama-gi in Sumerian). This same theme was found in an ancient bilingual Hittite-Hurrian text entitled "The Song of Debt Release". In Ancient Egypt interest-bearing debt did not exist for most of its history. When it started spreading in the Late Period, the rulers of Egypt regulated it and a number of debt remissions are known to have occurred during the Ptolemaic era, including the one whose proclamation was inscribed on the Rosetta Stone. Diodorus Siculus provides the following rationale for abolishing the debt bondage by pharaoh Bakenranef:

"For it would be absurd... that a soldier, at the moment perhaps when he was setting forth to fight for his fatherland, should be haled to prison by his creditor for an unpaid loan, and that the greed of private citizens should in this way endanger the safety of all"

Debt forgiveness is mentioned in the Torah, which says God commanded the Israelites to forgive debts in certain cases at the end of Shmita, the last year of the seven-year agricultural cycle. Hebrew slaves were also set free either at the same time or at the end of the 49-year cycle, depending on interpretation. At the end of the longer cycle, during Jubilee year the land also reverted to its original owners. According to Michael Hudson, the Jubilee law likely appeared in response to a debt crisis and took debt cancellation from the hands of the rulers, making it periodical and automatic. No contracts survive attesting to the compliance, or lack of it, with the Jubilee law.

Due to the First Exile, the laws of debt remission were no longer applicable, as most Jews were not living in the land of Israel, and the fact that the remission was tied to the restitution of ancestral land. Later Rabbis would decree that debts should continue to be remitted. Around the beginning of the 1st century CE Hillel established the prozbul loophole which enabled lenders to offer loans which could not be remitted, by redirecting the recipient of the repayment as the local Bet Din (court of law), which would then forward it to the original lender. Since the debt would be owed to a public institution instead of a private individual, it would not be remitted. Hillel argued that otherwise the poor would not be able to get a loan in the year preceding the remission.

== Ancient Greece and Rome ==
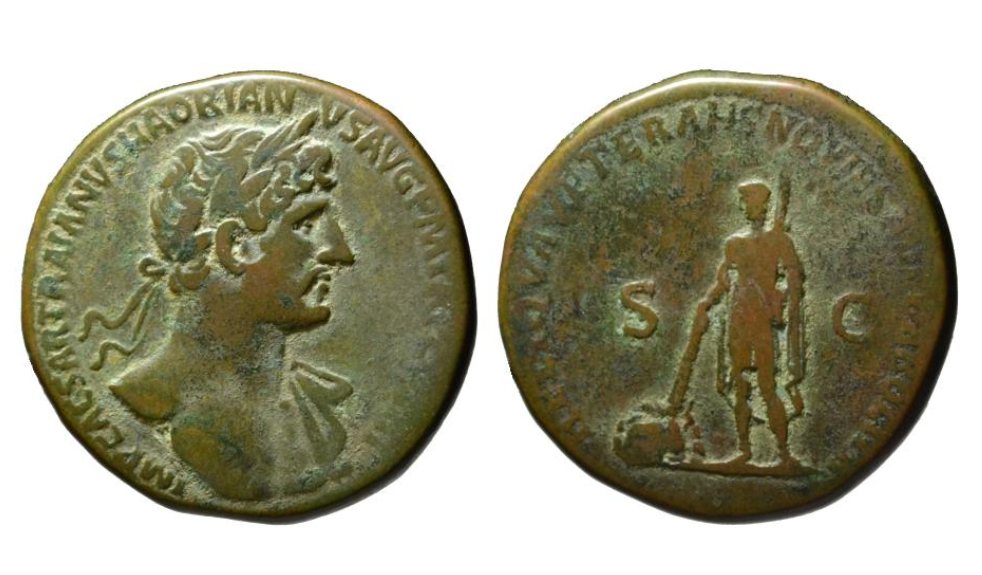
The obverse of Hadrian's sestertius commemorating the cancellation of tax arrears shows the emperor burning tax records

In general the law in ancient Greece and Rome was more creditor-friendly and "harsh and unyielding" towards debtors. Throughout antiquity the cancellation of debts, alongside land redistribution, was the main rallying cry of the poor.

In response to a debt crisis in the 6th century BCE, the Athenians implemented a law of Solon providing for seisachtheia (σεισάχθεια), which cancelled all debts and retroactively annulled previous debts that had resulted in slavery and serfdom, freeing debt slaves and debt serfs. According to Plutarch, interest-bearing debts were made illegal by the democratic government of Megara in the 6th century BCE while the creditors were forced to return the collected interest. This was treated as an extreme populist measure by Greek sources, and historians are divided as regards the historicity of these events, considered to reflect later anti-democratic political thought. The Spartan kings also implemented debt cancellations in their attempt to reform the state in the 3rd century BCE. The Roman equivalent was called novae tabulae.

In the Ancient Rome the debt bondage known as nexum was abolished in 313 BCE. However even after that the debtors were still required to perform compulsory labour, and could be imprisoned following a court judgement. Appian mentions an attempt by praetor Asellio to revive the old law prohibiting the taking of interest in 89 BC which led to his murder, presumably by the creditors. Later, partial debt cancellations were enacted by Sulla (by 10%) and then by Lucius Cornelius Cinna and Lucius Valerius Flaccus (by three quarters) in order to stabilise the economy ruined by the civil war. The Roman elites were firmly against debt relief, with Cicero denouncing it as an attack on property and the propertied classes.

The predecessors of the bankruptcy law emerged in early Imperial Rome. Augustus instituted cessio bonorum, allowing debtors to voluntarily surrender their property to creditors and thereby avoid personal arrest and loss of legal standing (infamia).

While Rome never enacted complete debt cancellation, several emperors wrote off tax arrears, that is, debts to the state treasury.

== China ==
The indebtedness of rural population was a constant government concern from the days of the Han dynasty. A variety of means were employed to deal with it, including full or partial debt relief. Often those loans whose repaid interest exceeded the principal were annulled. The government accused the Buddhist monasteries (which had become major lenders to the peasantry by the 6th century CE) of issuing high-interest loans. During the purge of Buddhist monasteries in 845, more than 150,000 temple serfs were released from bondage, according to the official reports.

== Medieval Europe ==
Medieval canon law built upon Roman law and extensively discussed provisions to mitigate the harshness of debtors' punishments. Most commentators allowed for a debtor to be discharged and make a fresh start, after ceding to his creditors all his goods (or possibly all his goods except some bare necessities). These provisions later influenced English bankruptcy law.

== Early modern canon law ==
The question of debt relief was particularly important in the writings of early modern canon lawyers and theologians, frequently members of the School of Salamanca, which were sensible to the needs of indigent debtors. If the real debt relief (called remissio debiti) remained rarely promoted due to the binding of the contractual engagement and was more considered as a gift of the creditor, the right to defer the payement (dilatio debiti) was thought as a temporary and more useful relief in case of extreme necessity or risks of important damages.

== Modern period ==
After Shays's Rebellion, Massachusetts passed debt-relief legislation.

In the modern period debt discharge typically occurs through the process of bankruptcy. One of the first countries to establish personal bankruptcy (rather than company bankruptcy) was the United Kingdom, where the Bankruptcy Act 1869 allowed all people to file for bankruptcy. Currently, the benchmark for personal bankruptcy legislation is the US personal bankruptcy legislation, passed in 1978. Most Western European countries followed suit in the 1980s and 1990s while in southern and eastern Europe personal bankruptcy legislation was passed in the 2000s and 2010s.

== See also ==
- Laguna Copperplate Inscription

== Sources ==
- Seager, Robin (1992). "Sulla". In Crook, John; et al. (eds.). The last age of the Roman Republic, 146–43 BC. Cambridge Ancient History. Vol. 9 (2nd ed.). Cambridge University Press. pp. 165–207. ISBN 0-521-85073-8. OCLC 121060.
- Keaveney, Arthur (2005). Sulla, the last republican. Routledge. ISBN 9780415336611.
- Hudson, Michael (2018). ... And Forgive Them Their Debts. ISLET-Verlag. ISBN 9783981826029.
- Graeber, David (2012). Debt. The First 5,000 Years. Melville House. ISBN 9781612191294.
- Finley, Moses I. (1973). The Ancient Economy. University of California Press. ISBN 9780520024366.
- Green, Peter (1990). Alexander to Actium: The Historical Evolution of the Hellenistic Age. University of California Press. ISBN 9780520083493.
- Decock, Wim (2017). "Law, Religion and Debt Relief: Balancing above the 'Abyss of Despair' in Early Modern Canon Law and Theology". American Journal of Legal History. 57 (2): 125–141.
