= Sabbatical year =

A sabbatical year is a year of rest, usually the seventh year, like the shabbat, which is the seventh day of the week in Judaism.

The term may refer to:

- The biblical concept of the shmita year
- The modern concept of an extended hiatus in work, a sabbatical year
- A gap year, also known as a sabbatical year, typically a year-long break before or after college/university during which students engage in various educational and developmental activities
