= Shevi'it (tractate) =

Jewish agrarian law from the Mishnah

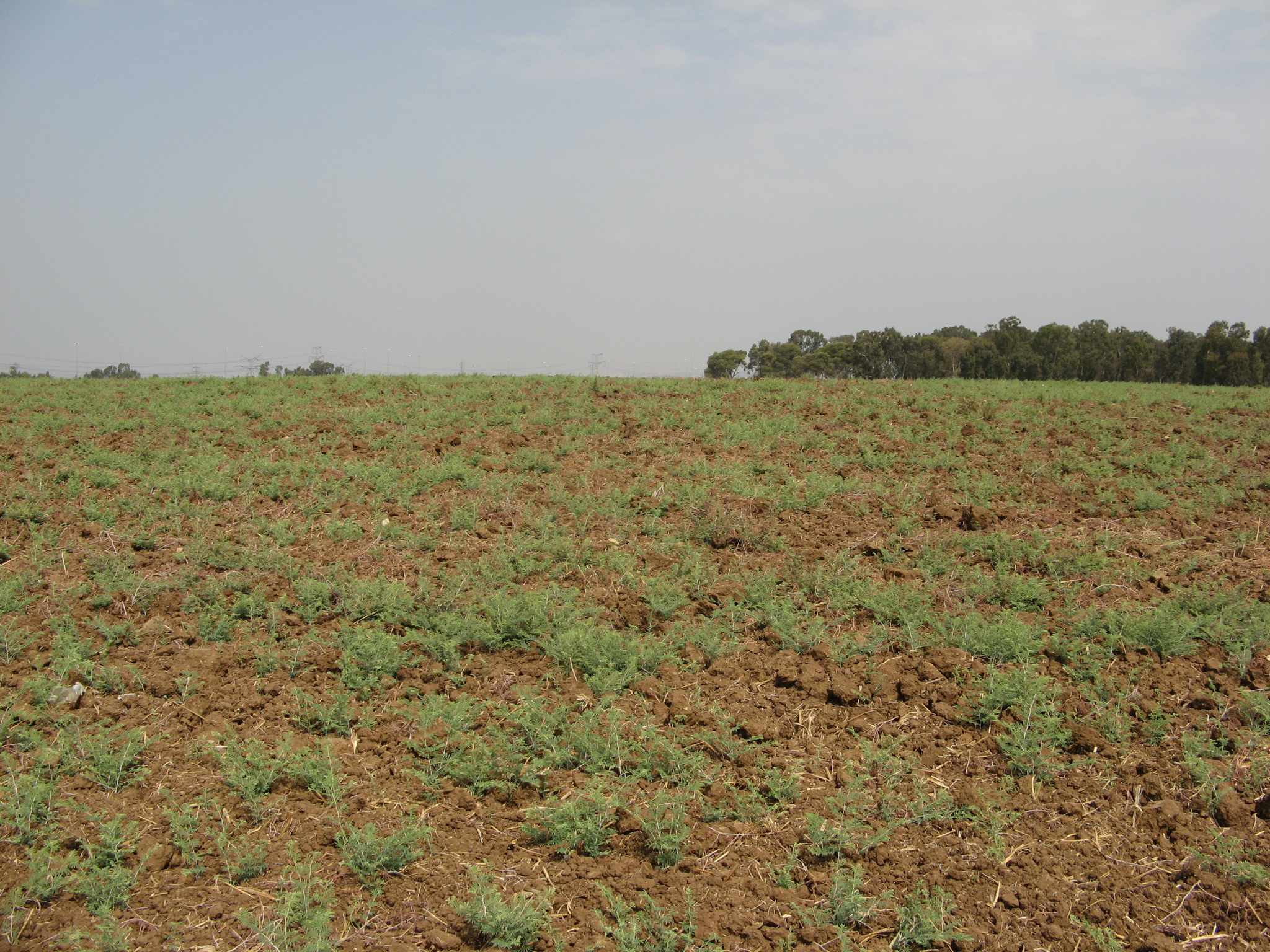
- Sabbatical year uncultivated field in modern Israel

Tractate of the Talmud
- English: Sabbatical Year
- Seder: Zeraim
- Number of mishnahs: 89
- Chapters: 10
- Babylonian Talmud pages: -
- Jerusalem Talmud pages: 31
- Tosefta chapters: 8

Shevi'it (Hebrew: שְׁבִיעִית, lit. "Seventh") is the fifth tractate of Seder Zeraim ("Order of Seeds") of the Mishnah, dealing with the laws of leaving the fields of the Land of Israel to lie fallow every seventh year; the laws concerning which produce may, or may not be eaten during the Sabbatical year; and the cancellation of debts and the rabbinical ordinance established to allow a creditor to reclaim a debt after the Sabbatical year (Prozbul).

The laws are derived from the Torah in Exodus 23:10–11, Leviticus 25:1–7 and Leviticus 25:20–22, and Deuteronomy 15:1–9.

This tractate comprises ten chapters in the Mishna and eight in the Tosefta and has thirty-one folio pages of Gemara in the Jerusalem Talmud. Like most tractates in the order of Zeraim, there is no Babylonian Talmud for this tractate.

The Jewish religious laws detailed in this tractate continue to apply in modern Israel, where the Sabbatical year, known as shmita, is still observed.

== Topics ==
This tractate deals with the details of the laws concerning the three main commandments of the Sabbatical year – known as Shmita (Hebrew: respite or release) – the prohibition of cultivating the land, the law of the sanctity of the produce of the land and of the remission of all debts.

As with most of the Torah's agricultural laws, the agricultural laws of the Sabbatical year apply only in the Land of Israel; however, by Rabbinic enactment, some were also applied to the adjoining land of Syria as well. The laws regarding loans, however, apply everywhere, both inside and outside of the Land of Israel.

=== Agricultural respite ===
Six years you may sow your field, six years you may prune your vineyard, gathering in its produce. But in the seventh year the land shall have a complete rest ... when you may neither sow your field nor prune your vineyard. The after growth of your harvest you shall not reap, nor shall you pick the grapes of your untrimmed vines ... While the land has its Sabbath, all the produce will be food equally for yourself and for your male and female servants, for your hired help and the tenants who live with you, and likewise for your livestock and the wild animals on your land.

— Leviticus 25:1-7

The Mishna establishes the rules for permissible and forbidden agricultural work during the seventh year and how the produce that grows during this year must be handled, in what the Mishna terms shmittat karka’in – respite of the Land – in accordance with the Torah’s requirements (Exodus 23:10–11, and Leviticus 25:2–7). Generally, farming activities are forbidden, such as planting in the fields, pruning vineyards and reaping grain or gathering produce. According to Torah law, four kinds of work are forbidden — sowing and reaping in the field and pruning trees and gathering their fruit. All other kinds of work which benefit the soil or trees are forbidden by Rabbinical law.

The tractate specifies the work that may or may not be performed, not only in the seventh year itself, but also thirty days before Rosh Hashanah. Only in cases of great loss was certain work allowed; and during periods of oppressive taxation by foreign rulers of the Land of Israel, was work allowed until the New Year itself, and even later. This prohibition is called "tosefet shevi'it" (Hebrew: addition to or extension of the Sabbatical Year), and applies only when the Temple of Jerusalem stands.

=== Sanctity of produce of the Sabbatical year ===
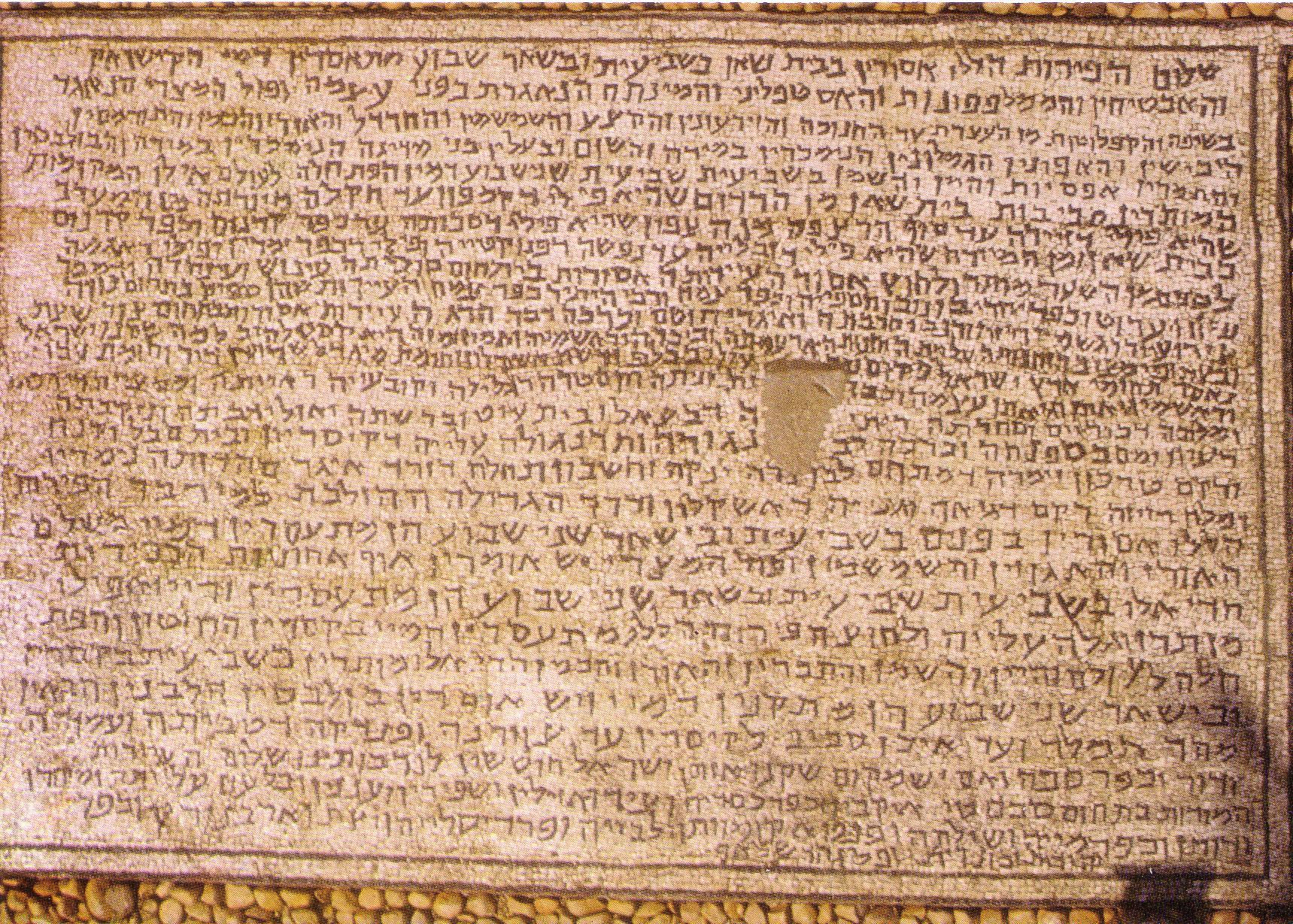
Mosaic of Rehob

The Mishna also elaborates on how produce that grows during the Sabbatical year must be treated with a higher degree of sanctity than that which is grown during the six ordinary years. Gathering and processing produce that grows of its own accord during the year is regulated but can be eaten by the owner of the land, servants, and guests, as well as the poor – the fields must be made accessible for anyone to take the produce, and once the produce is acquired, it is governed by special laws.

There are four specific commandments regarding the sanctity of the produce of the Sabbatical Year:

- All human production from the earth must rest and the produce that grows must be declared public property, allowing access to everybody.
- Trade in the produce of the Sabbatical year is forbidden.
- Produce of the Sabbatical year may not be destroyed or wasted. Both tree fruit and that which grew from seeds which fell to the ground before the Sabbatical year are permitted as food but must be treated as sanctified.
- People may eat from the produce of the Sabbatical year only while it can be found growing naturally in the field, but when a certain kind is no longer there, whatever of it remains in the house must be disposed of.

=== Discharge of loans ===
At the end of every seven-year period you shall have a relaxation of debts ... Every creditor shall release his claim on what he has loaned his neighbor; he shall not press his neighbor for payment.

— Deuteronomy 15:1-3

At the end of the seventh year, the Torah requires every creditor to discharge any personal loan made to a fellow Israelite in what is termed shmittat kesafim – release of debts – in accordance with Deuteronomy 15:1–10.

This release of debts was conceived for an agricultural community, where a debt would be contracted only in a case of poverty or misfortune, and the loan was considered an act of charity rather than a business transaction. However, as economic life became more complex during the Second Temple period, debts incurred in business transactions belonged to a different category and could not fairly be cancelled. Thus, people became reluctant to lend money to one another for fear of forfeiting their claim to it with the arrival of the Sabbatical year. The Talmudic sage, Hillel, who lived in the first century before the Common Era, interpreted the biblical verses to exclude debts that had been secured by order of the court before the start of the Sabbatical Year from the operation of the law and enacted a legal instrument known as Prozbul, drawn up by a court to empower the collection of a debt due to a creditor.

The biblical law (as prescribed in Deuteronomy 15:1-3) concerning the cancellation of debts was left unchanged by technically changing the status of individual private loans into the public administration, according to which the court, instead of the individual lender, reclaimed the loan. This allowed the poor to receive interest-free loans before the Sabbatical year, while protecting the investments of the lenders.

The last chapter of tractate Shevi’it details this legal instrument and specifies how it is drawn up in a court when the loan is made.

=== Aggadah ===
The tractate also contains aggadic material and the Jerusalem Talmud describes several occurrences in the lives of several Talmudic sages intended to convey messages of morals and principles:

One such story is that of Rabbi Abba bar Zemina, who was in Rome and was offered meat from an animal which had not been slaughtered in the kosher manner to eat and threatened with death should he refuse; when the rabbi remained steadfast, the Roman admitted that, in fact, he had wanted only to test his loyalty to Judaism, and, on the contrary, he would have killed him had he eaten it, stating, in the words of the Talmud 'if one is a Jew, one should be a true Jew, and faithfully observe the principles of his religion" (Jerusalem Talmud, 4:2, 35a-b).

The Talmud also relates a story that as a matter of piety (middat hasidut), Rav told his household that if they promised to give something to someone else, they should not withdraw the offer, even if the promise was not legally binding; he said this despite his known halakhic ruling that a withdrawal from an agreement that was not legally binding is not a formal breach of faith. Having mentioned that the sages are pleased with someone who repays a debt despite the Sabbatical year, the tractate concludes that the person who keeps their word and does not seek to evade a commitment, even though it was not legally binding, is honored.

== Structure and content ==
The tractate consists of ten chapters and eighty-nine paragraphs (mishnayot). It has a Gemara – rabbinical analysis of and commentary on the Mishnah – only in the Jerusalem Talmud. There is a Tosefta of eight chapters for this tractate.

There is no Gemara in the Babylonian Talmud for this tractate, or indeed for any of the tractates of this order of the Mishna, other than tractate Berakhot, as the laws related to agriculture that are mostly discussed in this order generally have no practical application outside of the Land of Israel.

An overview of the topics of the chapters is as follows:

- Chapter 1 concerns what parcels of land are considered fields, fields on which trees grow, and the length of time during which these lands may be cultivated in the sixth year.
- Chapter 2 concerns fields that do not have trees; how long these lands may be cultivated, fertilized, and otherwise cultivated in the year before the seventh year; how late in the sixth year crops may be planted, and how long those already planted may be tended; it specifically addresses rules for fields of rice and millet, beans, onions, and gourds.
- Chapter 3 describes the time in the seventh year after which preparatory work in fields, such as fertilizing, fencing, and removal of stones, may be done; and how for work such as in a quarry or tearing down a wall, any appearance of preparation for cultivation must be avoided.
- Chapter 4 deals with the clearing of stones, wood, and weeds from fields; cases in which, as a punishment for preparatory work done in the seventh year, the field may not be sown even in the eighth year; rules about cutting down and pruning trees; the time after which a person may begin to eat what has grown in the fields in the seventh year, and when one may take it home; and the permissibility for a non-Jew to cultivate the soil in the seventh year.
- Chapter 5 describes practices necessary in the case of certain plants, such as white figs, arum, early onions, and madder; objects, such as agricultural implements, which may not be sold in the seventh year, and those which may not be lent.
- Chapter 6 speaks of the differences between the various areas of the Holy Land regarding shmita observance and details the distinctions between the provinces with regard to the seventh year, together with an account of the regions of the Land of Israel which were settled by the Israelites, as distinct from those areas to which the Jews returned from Babylonia under Ezra; details concerning the region of Syria; and forbidden exports from and imports to the Land of Israel.
- Chapter 7 details general rules regarding products of the seventh year, the prohibition against trading in the produce of this year and other items with which it is forbidden to deal.
- Chapter 8 provides general rules for the produce of the seventh year; how it may be sold without being measured, weighed, or counted; and the actions required if the money received for the produce of the seventh year is spent on land, cattle, or any other object.
- Chapter 9 deals with herbs and greens which may be purchased in the seventh year from anyone; use and removal of the produce of the seventh year, and the division of the Land of Israel regarding removing such crops.
- Chapter 10 deals with the laws concerning the release from debt; debts which fall due in the seventh year and those which do not; the arrangements and form of the Prozbul and cases in which it is invalid; and praiseworthy cases in which either debtors or creditors fulfil their obligations even in cases where they are not legally obligated to do so.

== Historical context ==
The Tosefta describes how the produce of the Sabbatical year was stored in communal granaries, from which it was divided every Friday on the eve of the weekly Sabbath among all the families according to their need.

According to the Roman-Jewish historian, Josephus, the Greek ruler Alexander the Great and the Roman emperor Julius Caesar both cancelled the usual taxes from the Jews in the Land of Israel during the Sabbatical year out of consideration for the agricultural inactivity and associated lack of income. Other Greek and Roman rulers of the Land of Israel were not as accommodating and the tractate therefore addresses these circumstances of hardship due to the demands of the ruling powers.

Many of the mishnayot discuss agricultural methods for field crops and fruit trees. Hence this tractate is an important source for understanding agriculture and horticulture in ancient Israel.

== Commentaries ==
The major early commentaries on the Mishna are collected and printed along with the text of the Mishna in the standard Vilna editions of the Talmud, following the tractate Berakhot. New editions based on manuscripts differ significantly from the Vilna edition in many cases.

=== Medieval ===
Medieval commentaries on this tractate include the following:

- Ribmas, one of the earliest known comprehensive commentaries on Seder Zera'im, written in the early 12th century by Rabbi Isaac ben Melchizedek of Siponto
- Rash, a commentary by Rabbi Shimshon of Sens, printed in the Mutzal Me'esh edition of the Jerusalem Talmud. The commentary of Rabbenu Asher (Rosh) has been particularly abridged in the Vilna edition, which perceived it to be nothing more than glosses to the commentary of Rash. Although Rosh does follow Rash to a great extent, his reformulations of Rash makes many clarifying changes.
- Rosh, the commentary of Rabbenu Asher
- Rambam, Maimonides' Commentary on the Mishna
- Rash Sirilio, the comprehensive commentary on a large portion of the Jerusalem Talmud by Rabbi Solomon Sirilio, appears in the Mutzal Mi’Eish edition of the Jerusalem Talmud (but not in the Vilna edition). His commentary is cited regularly, often anonymously, by Melekhet Shlomo.

=== Modern ===
During the nineteenth century, with the renewal of Jewish agricultural communities in the Land of Israel, and the re-establishment of Jewish sovereignty in the land with the State of Israel in the twentieth century, the subject of the Sabbatical year generated a large number of works. The following are some of the commentaries that have been published:

- Pe'at Ha'Shulchan by Rabbi Yisroel of Shklov, a disciple of the Vilna Gaon
- Aruch Ha'Shulchan He'Atid by Rabbi Yechiel Michel Epstein
- Chazon Ish by Rabbi Avraham Yeshayah Karelitz;
- Maadanei Aretz by Rabbi Shlomo Zalman Auerbach
- Shabbat Ha'Aretz by Rabbi Avraham Isaac HaKohen Kook.

Works that are of assistance interpreting the many botanical references in the tractate include:

- Feliks, Yehudah (1963). Ha-Ḥakla'ut be-Ereẓ Yisrael bi-Tekufat ha-Mishnah ve-ha-Talmud (in Hebrew). Jerusalem, Israel. "(Agriculture in the Land of Israel during the time of the Mishna and the Talmud)"
- Amar, Zohar. Machberet Tzimchei HaMishnah shel Rabbi Yosef Kafich (in Hebrew). Bar Ilan University. "Notes on Plants of the Mishnah of Rabbi Yosef Kafich" (Rabbi Yosef Kafich in his notes to Rambam's Commentary in Arabic identifies numerous species by their Latin equivalents)
