= Prozbul =

Rabbinic writ preventing cancellation of loans

Halakhic texts relating to this article
- Torah: Deuteronomy 15
- Mishnah: Gittin 4:3, Shevi'it 10:3
- Babylonian Talmud: Gittin 34b–37b
- Jerusalem Talmud: Shevi'it ch. 10

The Prozbul (Hebrew: פרוזבול, borrowed from Koinē Greek: προσβολή) is a halachic mechanism allowing for the collection of debts against loans that have come due, and preventing their cancellation by the monetary Shmita process (The Lord's Release).

The Prozbul was established in the waning years of the Second Temple of Jerusalem by Hillel the Elder. The writ, issued historically by rabbis, changed the status of individual private loans into the public administration, which made them ineligible for cancellation on the year of Shmita. This allowed the poor to receive interest-free loans before the Sabbatical year while protecting the investments of the lenders.

== Historical background ==
The Torah mandates a Sabbatical year, Shmita, every seventh year (not to be confused with the Jubilee, which is the year following seven cycles of Shmita). Among other things, the departure of the Sabbatical year cancels all debts. This is one of the many laws in the Torah meant to protect the poor and disadvantaged, affording them a chance to escape from eternal debt.

Conversely, the law harmed the lenders who would never be reimbursed once the Sabbatical year ended to remit all debts. The wealthy refused to loan money during the latter years of the seven-year cycle, refusing the poor even a temporary opportunity to make ends meet.

== Rabbinic response ==
The rabbis of the time found the state of affairs to be both a major challenge to the status quo and a violation of numerous mitzvot, Torah commandments, that require magnanimity to the poor, including one within the aforementioned passage in Deuteronomy. The rabbis, under the suggestion of Hillel the Elder, created a loophole in Jewish law, in which a legal document would accompany the interest-free loans (charging interest to fellow Jews is forbidden in the Torah) issued by individuals that stated that the loans were to be transferred to the courts as the law of remission does not apply to loans within the public domain. This groundbreaking institution benefited both borrower and lender; because lenders knew their money was safe even following the Sabbatical year, they were likely to loan to the poor.

The last chapter of Tractate Shevi'it, chapter 10, in the Mishna and the Jerusalem Talmud, details the prozbul legal instrument and specifies how it is drawn up in a court when the loan is made.

== Significance ==
The practice of the prozbul was groundbreaking and controversial. "Later Amoraim expressed their astonishment at the fact that Hillel dared to abrogate the Mosaic institution of the release of all debts every seventh year." There is a major debate in the Talmud whether rabbis have the authority to uproot from the Torah and the issue of prozbul is one of the first examples of this debate being tested.

Certain rabbis claim that the Jubilee year is commanded by the Torah only when the majority of Jews are based in the Land of Israel. Thus, when they are dispersed around the world, shmita, like certain other laws, would not be required by the Torah. According to these rabbis, the Great Sanhedrin enacted their own law that while in the Land of Israel Jews must continue to observe shmita so its observance will not be forgotten (prior to the entire Jewish people's eventual return to the land of Israel).

Thus, if one would agree that shmita does not apply when Israelites are dispersed, Hillel, great as he was, would not have changed a law of the Torah in order to fit the needs of his time. He and his beth din would have enacted a rabbinic exception to a rabbinic law. As Maimonides noted in Shmita V'Yovel chapter 9, when most Jews again live in the Land of Israel and the observance of the Sabbatical and Jubilee years are Toraitic commandments, the prozbul will no longer be able to be used. According to this theory, Prozbul, like `eruv, is a rabbinic exception to a rabbinic enactment. Prozbul cannot be used to get around the Torah commanded shmita and yovel, just as `eruv cannot be used to get around the fact that Torah prohibited carrying in the public domain.

== See also ==
- Shmita
- Yovel
