= Ama-gi =

Sumerian term for "freedom" or "manumission"

𒂼𒄄 ama-gi_{4} written in Classical Sumerian cuneiform

Ama-gi is a Sumerian word written 𒂼𒄄 ama-gi_{4} or 𒂼𒅈𒄄 ama-ar-gi_{4}. Sumerians used it to refer to release from obligations, debt, slavery, taxation, or punishment. Ama-gi has been regarded as the first known written reference to the concept of freedom, and has been used in modern times as a symbol for libertarianism.

== Sumerian use ==
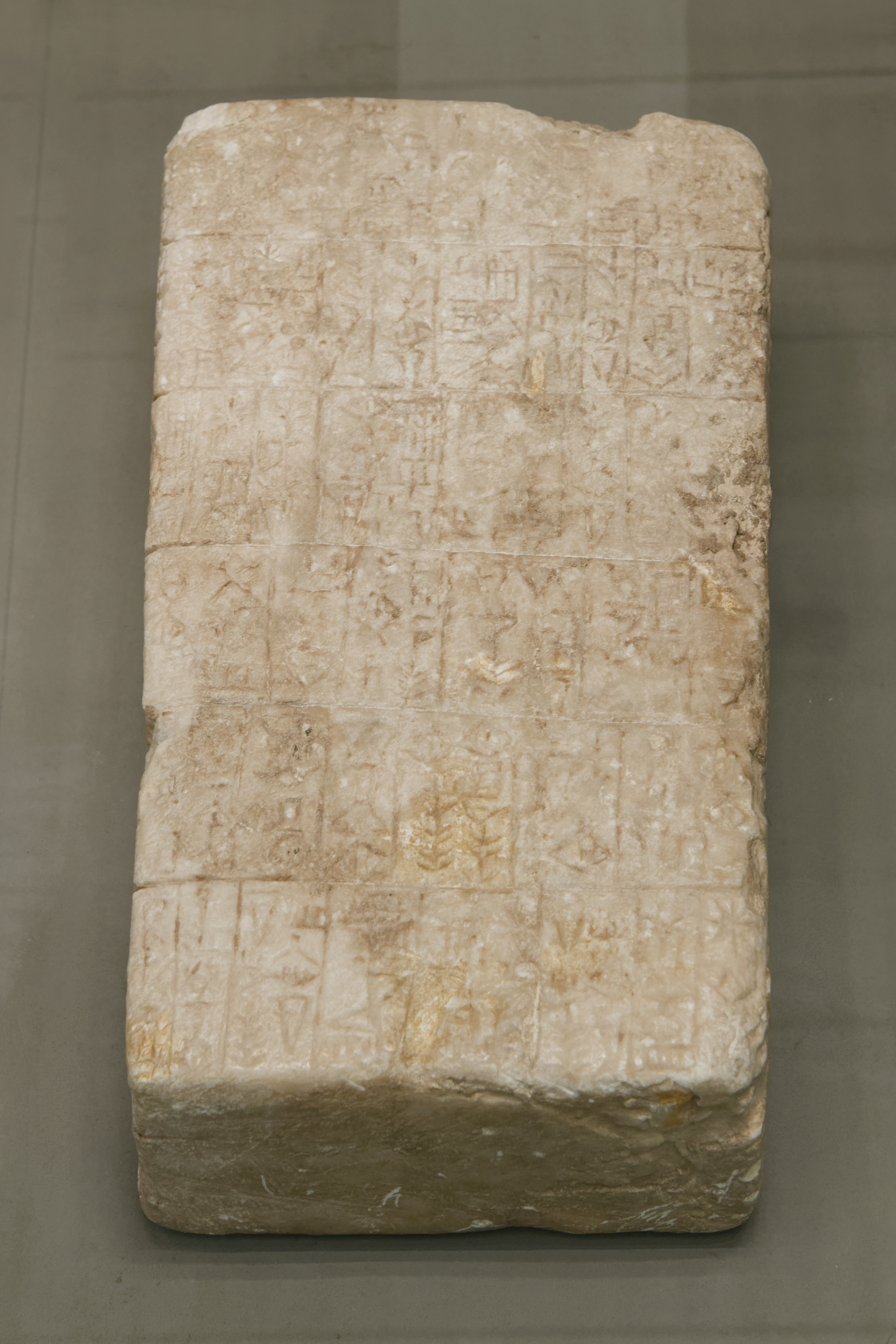
Enmetena's foundation stone contains the first known mention of the word Ama-gi

Ama-gi has been translated as "freedom", as well as "manumission", "exemption from debts or obligations", and "the restoration of persons and property to their original status" including the remission of debts. Other interpretations include a "reversion to a previous state" and release from debt, slavery, taxation or punishment.

The word originates from the noun ama "mother" (sometimes with the enclitic dative case marker ar), and the present participle gi_{4} "return, restore, put back", thus literally meaning "returning to mother". Assyriologist Samuel Noah Kramer has identified it as the first known written reference to the concept of freedom. Referring to its literal meaning "return to the mother", he wrote in 1963 that "we still do not know why this figure of speech came to be used for 'freedom'."

The earliest known usage of the word was in the decree of Enmetena restoring "the child to his mother and the mother to her child." By the Third Dynasty of Ur, it was used as a legal term for the manumission of individuals.

In some cuneiform texts, it is translated by the Akkadian word andurāru(m), meaning "freedom", "exemption" and "release from (debt) slavery".

== Modern libertarian use ==
A number of libertarian organizations have adopted the cuneiform glyph as a symbol claiming it is "the earliest-known written appearance of the word 'freedom' or 'liberty.'" It is used as a logo by the Instituto Político para la Libertad of Peru, the New Economic School – Georgia, Libertarian publishing firm Liberty Fund, and was the name and logo of the journal of the London School of Economics' Hayek Society. British musician Frank Turner and Alberta premier Danielle Smith have the symbol tattooed on their forearms.

== Suggested uses ==
Writing in The New York Times, author Paul Vigna suggested considering use of a Sumerian-style "amargi" as a way to deal with the $40 trillion national debt of the United States.
