= Abba bar Zemina =

4th-century Jewish rabbi

Abba bar Zemina (Hebrew: אבא בר זמינא) or bar Zebina (Hebrew: בר זבינא) was a Jewish rabbi of the fourth century (fourth generation of amoraim).

== Biography ==
He was a pupil of Rav Zeira, in whose name he transmitted many sayings. He was employed in Rome as a tailor in the house of a Gentile who, under the threat of death, tried to force him to break the dietary laws. Abba, however, steadfastly refused to yield to this, and showed so much courage that the Roman admiringly exclaimed: "If you had eaten, I should have killed you. If you be a Jew, be a Jew; if a heathen, a heathen!"

Tanhuma bar Abba relates another anecdote concerning a pious tailor at Rome, who bought the most expensive fish; this anecdote may refer to Abba bar Zemina, but elsewhere the same story is told of Joseph, "the reverer of the Sabbath".
