= Shmita =

Seventh year of Jewish agricultural cycle

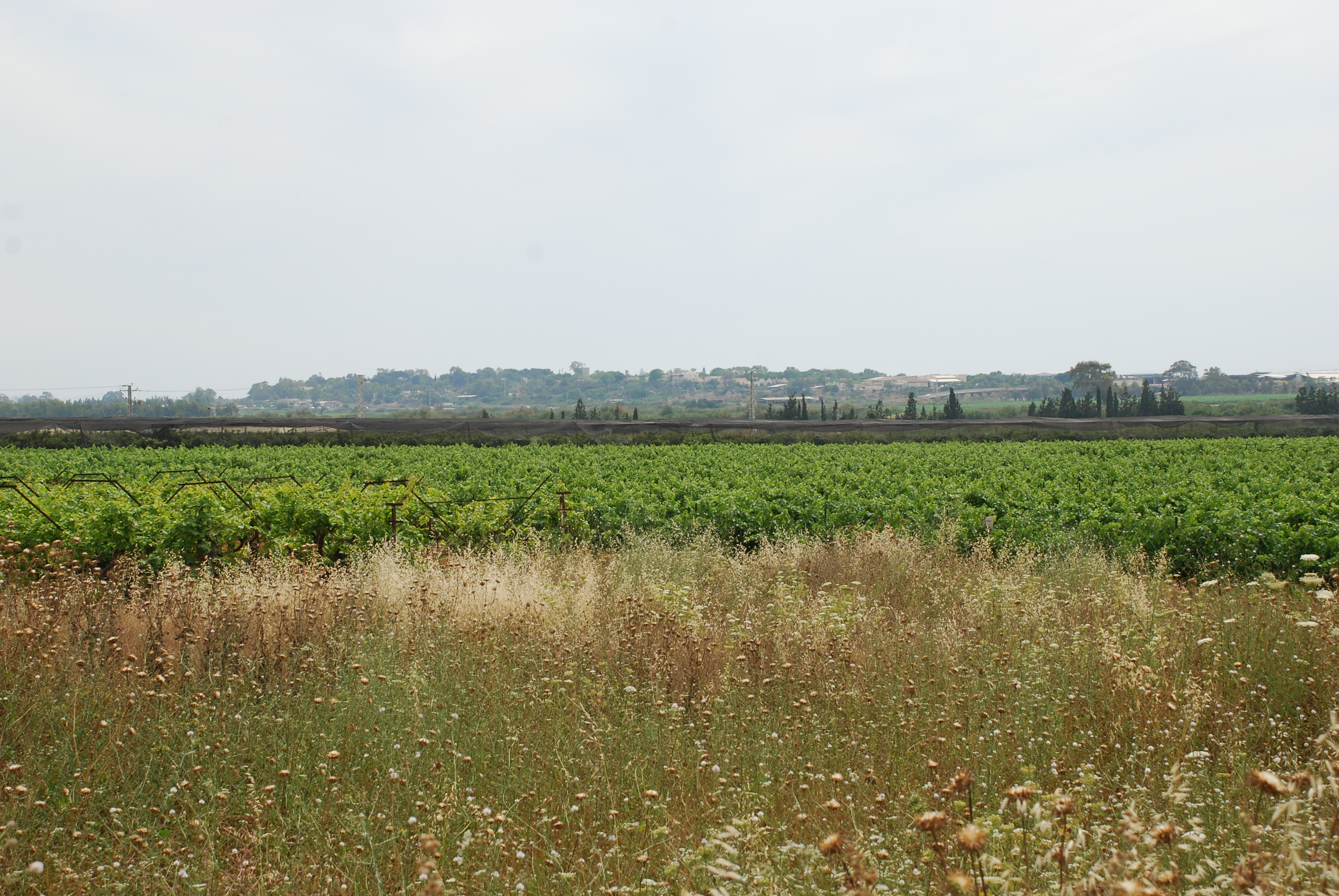

Halakhic texts relating to this article
- Torah: Exodus 23:10–11, Leviticus 25:2–7 Leviticus 25:20–22 and Deuteronomy 15:1–3.
- Mishnah: Shevi'it (tractate)
- Jerusalem Talmud: Shevi'it (tractate)

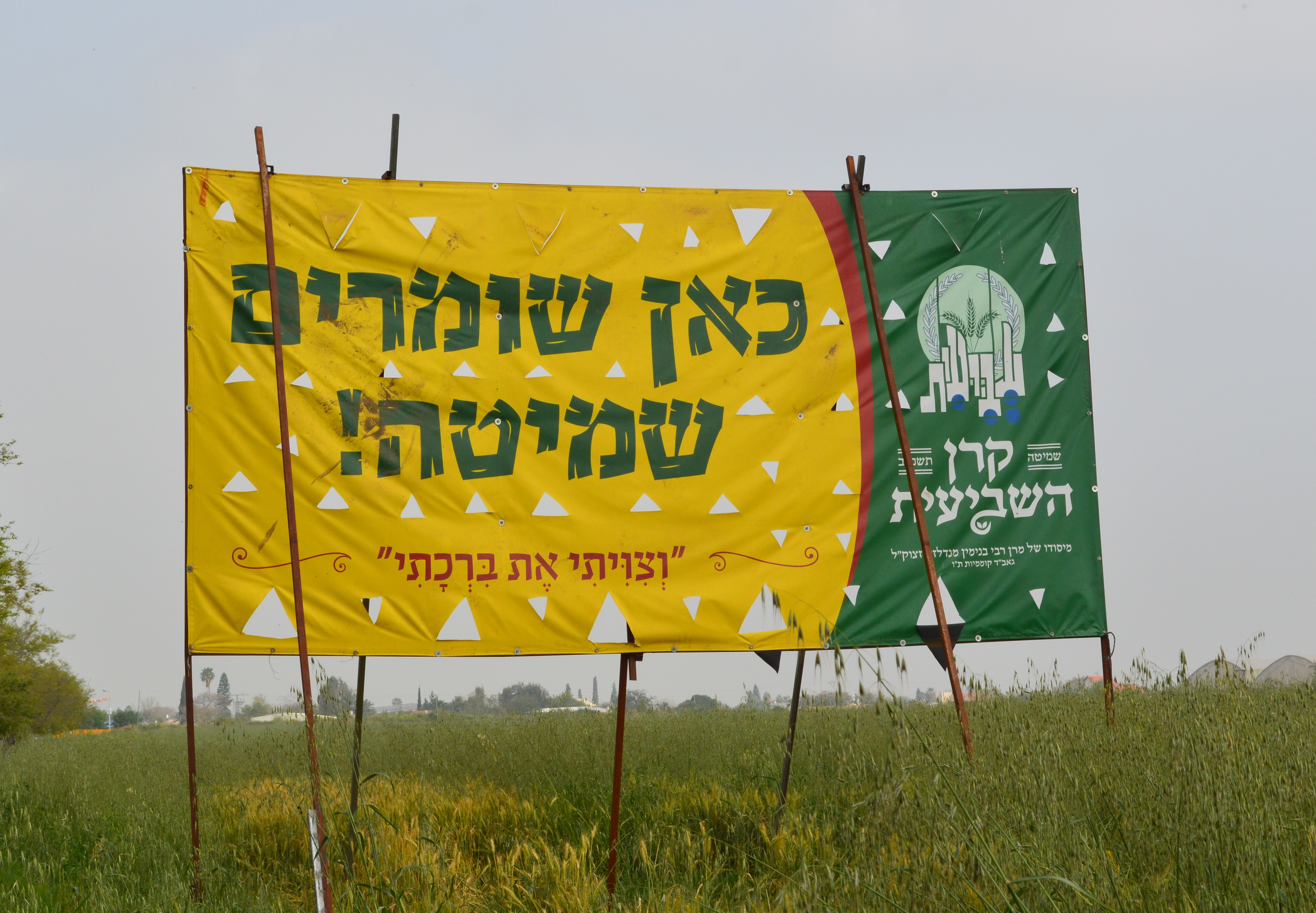
Shmita placard in an agricultural field (in the year 5782)

The sabbath year or sabbatical year (Hebrew: שביעית, romanized: shǝviʿit, lit. 'seventh'), also called the shmita (שמיטה, shǝmīṭā, 'release') or "sabbath of the Land", is the seventh year of the seven-year agricultural cycle mandated by the Torah in the Land of Israel and is observed in Judaism.

During shmita, the land is left to lie fallow and all agricultural activity, including plowing, planting, pruning and harvesting, is forbidden by halakha (Jewish law). Other cultivation techniques (such as watering, fertilizing, weeding, spraying, trimming and mowing) may be performed as a preventive measure only, not to improve the growth of trees or other plants. Additionally, any fruits or herbs which grow of their own accord and where no watch is kept over them are deemed hefker (ownerless) and may be picked by anyone. A variety of laws also apply to the sale, consumption and disposal of shmita produce. All debts, except those of foreigners, were to be remitted.

Chapter 25 of the Book of Leviticus promises bountiful harvests to those who observe the shmita, and describes its observance as a test of religious faith.

The most recent shmita year was 2021–2022 or Anno mundi 5782 in the Hebrew calendar. The next shmita cycle will be in 2028–2029, year 5789 in the Hebrew calendar.

== Ancient Israel ==
=== Ancient Near East fallow years ===
It is still discussed among scholars of the Ancient Near East whether or not there is clear evidence for a seven-year cycle in Ugaritic texts. It is also debated how the biblical seventh fallow year would fit in with, for example Assyrian practice of a four-year cycle and crop rotation, and whether the one year in seven was an extra fallow year. Yehuda Feliks suggests that the land may have been farmed only 3 years in seven. Elie Borowski (1987) takes the fallow year as one year in seven. Niesiołowski-Spanò argues (2025) that originally the sabbatical year legislation was directed only toward the land owned by the Temple, not by the individual farmers.

=== Biblical references ===
A sabbath year (shmita) is mentioned several times in the Hebrew Bible by name or by its pattern of six years of activity and one of rest:

- Book of Exodus: "You may plant your land for six years and gather its crops. But during the seventh year, you must leave it alone and withdraw from it. The needy among you will then be able to eat just as you do, and whatever is left over can be eaten by wild animals. This also applies to your vineyard and your olive grove." (Exodus 23:10–11)
- Book of Leviticus: "God spoke to Moses at Mount Sinai, telling him to speak to the Israelites and say to them: When you come to the land that I am giving you, the land must be given a rest period, a sabbath to God. For six years you may plant your fields, prune your vineyards, and harvest your crops, but the seventh year is a sabbath of sabbaths for the land. It is God's sabbath during which you may not plant your fields, nor prune your vineyards. Do not harvest crops that grow on their own and do not gather the grapes on your unpruned vines, since it is a year of rest for the land. [What grows while] the land is resting may be eaten by you, by your male and female slaves, and by the employees and resident hands who live with you. All the crops shall be eaten by the domestic and wild animals that are in your land." (Leviticus 25:1–7)
  "And if ye shall say: 'What shall we eat the seventh year? behold, we may not sow, nor gather in our increase'; then I will command My blessing upon you in the sixth year, and it shall bring forth produce for the three years. And ye shall sow the eighth year, and eat of the produce, the old store; until the ninth year, until her produce come in, ye shall eat the old store." (Leviticus 25:20–22)
  " I will scatter you among the nations, and keep the sword drawn against you. Your land will remain desolate, and your cities in ruins. Then, as long as the land is desolate and you are in your enemies' land, the land will enjoy its sabbaths. The land will rest and enjoy its sabbatical years. Thus, as long as it is desolate, [the land] will enjoy the sabbatical rest that you would not give it when you lived there." (Leviticus 26:33–35)
- Book of Deuteronomy: "At the end of every seven years, you shall celebrate the remission year. The idea of the remission year is that every creditor shall remit any debt owed by his neighbor and brother when God's remission year comes around. You may collect from the alien, but if you have any claim against your brother for a debt, you must relinquish it...." (Deuteronomy 15:1–6)
  "Moses then gave them the following commandment: 'At the end of each seven years, at a fixed time on the festival of Sukkoth, after the year of release, when all Israel comes to present themselves before God your Lord, in the place that He will choose, you must read this Torah before all Israel, so that they will be able to hear it. 'You must gather together the people, the men, women, children and proselytes from your settlements, and let them hear it. They will thus learn to be in awe of God your Lord, carefully keeping all the words of this Torah. Their children, who do not know, will listen and learn to be in awe of God your Lord, as long as you live in the land which you are crossing the Jordan to occupy'." (Deuteronomy 31:10–13)
- Book of Jeremiah: Thus saith the LORD, the God of Israel: I made a covenant with your fathers in the day that I brought them forth out of the land of Egypt, out of the house of bondage, saying: "At the end of seven years ye shall let go every man his brother that is a Hebrew, that hath been sold unto thee, and hath served thee six years, thou shalt let him go free from thee"; but your fathers hearkened not unto Me, neither inclined their ear." (Jeremiah 34:13–14)
- Book of Nehemiah: "and if the peoples of the land bring ware or any victuals on the sabbath day to sell, that we would not buy of them on the sabbath, or on a holy day; and that we would forego the seventh year, and the exaction of every debt." (Nehemiah 10:31)
- Books of Chronicles: "... And them that had escaped from the sword carried he away to Babylon; and they were servants to him and his sons until the reign of the kingdom of Persia; to fulfil the word of the Lord by the mouth of Jeremiah, until the land had been paid her sabbaths; for as long as she lay desolate she kept sabbath, to fulfil threescore and ten years. (2 Chronicles 36:20–21)
- Books of Kings: (Isaiah speaking) "... And this is the sign for you: This year you shall eat what grows of itself, and the next year what springs from that, and in the third year, sow and reap and plant vineyards and eat their fruit. And the survivors of the House of Judah that have escaped shall regenerate its stock below and produce boughs above." (2 Kings 19:29).

The 2 Kings passage (and its parallel in Isaiah 37:30) refers to a sabbath (shmita) year followed by a jubilee (yovel) year. The text says that in the first year the people were to eat "what grows of itself", which is expressed by one word in the Hebrew, saphiah (ספיח). In Leviticus 25:5, the reaping of the saphiah is forbidden for a Sabbath year, explained by rabbinic commentary to mean the prohibition of reaping in the ordinary way (with, for example, a sickle), but permitted to be plucked in a limited way by one's own hands for one's immediate needs during the Sabbath year.

There is an alternative explanation used to rectify what appears to be a discrepancy in the two biblical sources, taken from Adam Clarke's 1837 Bible commentary. The Assyrian siege had lasted until after planting time in the fall of 701 BCE, and although the Assyrians left immediately after the prophecy was given (2 Kings 19:35), they had consumed the harvest of that year before they left, leaving only the saphiah to be gleaned from the fields. In the next year, the people were to eat "what springs from that", Hebrew sahish (סחיש). Since this word occurs only here and in the parallel passage in Isaiah 37:30, where it is spelled שחיס, there is some uncertainty about its exact meaning. If it is the same as the shabbat ha-arets (שבת הארץ) that was permitted to be eaten in a Sabbath year in Leviticus 25:6, then there is a ready explanation why there was no harvest: the second year, i.e. the year starting in the fall of 700 BCE, was a Sabbath year, after which normal sowing and reaping resumed in the third year, as stated in the text.

Another interpretation obviates all of the speculation about the Sabbath year entirely, translating the verse as: "And this shall be the sign for you, this year you shall eat what grows by itself, and the next year, what grows from the tree stumps, and in the third year, sow and reap, and plant vineyards and eat their fruit." According to the Judaica Press commentary, it was Sennacherib's invasion that prevented the people of Judah from sowing in the first year and Isaiah was promising that enough plants would grow to feed the population for the rest of the first year and the second year. Therefore, Isaiah was truly providing a sign to Hezekiah that God would save the city of Jerusalem, as explicitly stated, and not an injunction concerning the Sabbath (shmita) or jubilee (yovel) years, which are not mentioned at all in the passage.

== Historical shmita years ==
Various attempts have been made to reconstruct when Sabbatical years actually fell using clues in the biblical text and events clearly dated in fixed historically understood calendars. This is important because the system of shmita and Jubilee years provides a useful check in deciding between competing reconstructions of the histories of the First Temple period and earlier and the history of the Second Temple period and later. There are explicit mentions of a Sabbatical year found in Josephus, 1 Maccabees, and in various legal contracts from the time of Simon bar Kokhba. In contrast, no direct statements that a certain year was a Sabbatical year have survived from First Temple times and earlier.

The Jewish method of calculating the recurring Sabbatical year (shmita) has been greatly misunderstood by modern chroniclers of history, owing to their unfamiliarity with Jewish practice, which has led to many speculations and inconsistencies in computations. According to Maimonides (Mishne Torah, Hil. Shmita ve-Yovel 10:7), during the Second Temple period, the seven-year cycle which repeated itself every seven years was actually dependent upon the fixation of the Jubilee, or the fiftieth year, which temporarily broke off the counting of the seven-year cycle. Moreover, the laws governing the Jubilee (e.g. release of Hebrew bondmen, and the return of leased property to its original owners, etc.) were never applied all throughout the Second Temple period, but the Jubilee was being used during the period of the Second Temple in order to fix and sanctify thereby the Sabbatical year. A Sabbatical year could not be fixed without the year of the Jubilee, since the Jubilee serves to break-off the 7 × 7-year cycle, before resuming its count once again in the 51st year. While the 49th year is also a Sabbatical year, the fiftieth year is not the 1st year in a new seven-year cycle, but rather is the Jubilee. Its number is not incorporated into the seven-year cycle. Rather, the new seven-year cycle begins afresh in the 51st year, and in this manner is the cycle repeated. After the Temple's destruction, the people began a new practice to number each seventh year as a Sabbatical year, without the necessity of adding a fiftieth year.

== Rabbinical interpretations ==
The rabbis of the Talmud and later times interpreted the shmita laws in various ways to ease the burden they created for farmers and the agricultural industry. The heter mechira (leniency of sale), developed for the shmita year of 1888–1889, permitted Jewish farmers to sell their land to non-Jews so that they could continue to work the land as usual during shmita. This temporary solution to the impoverishment of the Jewish settlement in those days was later adopted by the Chief Rabbinate of Israel as a permanent edict, generating ongoing controversy between Zionist and Haredi leaders to this day. There is a major debate among halakhic authorities as to what is the nature of the obligation of the Sabbatical year nowadays. Some say it is still biblically binding, as it has always been. Others hold that it is rabbinically binding, since the shmita only biblically applies when the Jubilee year is in effect, but the Sages of the Talmud legislated the observance of the shmita anyway as a reminder of the biblical statute. And yet others hold that the shmita has become purely voluntary. An analysis by respected posek and former Sephardic Chief Rabbi Ovadiah Yosef in his responsa Yabi'a Omer (Vol. 10), accorded with the middle option, that the biblical obligation holds only when a majority of the Jewish people is living in the biblical Land of Israel and hence the shmita nowadays is a rabbinic obligation in nature. This approach potentially admits for some leniencies which would not be possible if the Shemitah were biblical in origin, including the aforementioned sale of the land of Israel. Haredi authorities, on the other hand, generally follow the view of the Chazon Ish, that the shmita continues to be a biblical obligation.

Rabbi Joshua Falk, author of Sefer Me'irat Einayim on Choshen Mishpat, holds that shmita nowadays is only a rabbinic obligation, and, subsequently, the biblical promise of bounty for those who observe the shmita (Leviticus 25:20–22) only applies when the biblical obligation is in effect, and hence that the biblical promise of bounty is not in effect today. However, the Chazon Ish, who holds that the biblical obligation of shmita observance remains in effect today, holds that the biblical promise of bounty follows it and Divine bounty is promised to Jews living in the Land of Israel today, just as it was promised in ancient times. However, he holds that Jews should generally not demand miracles from Heaven and hence that one should not rely on this promise for one's sustenance, but should instead make appropriate arrangements and rely on permissible leniencies.

== Observance in the Land of Israel ==
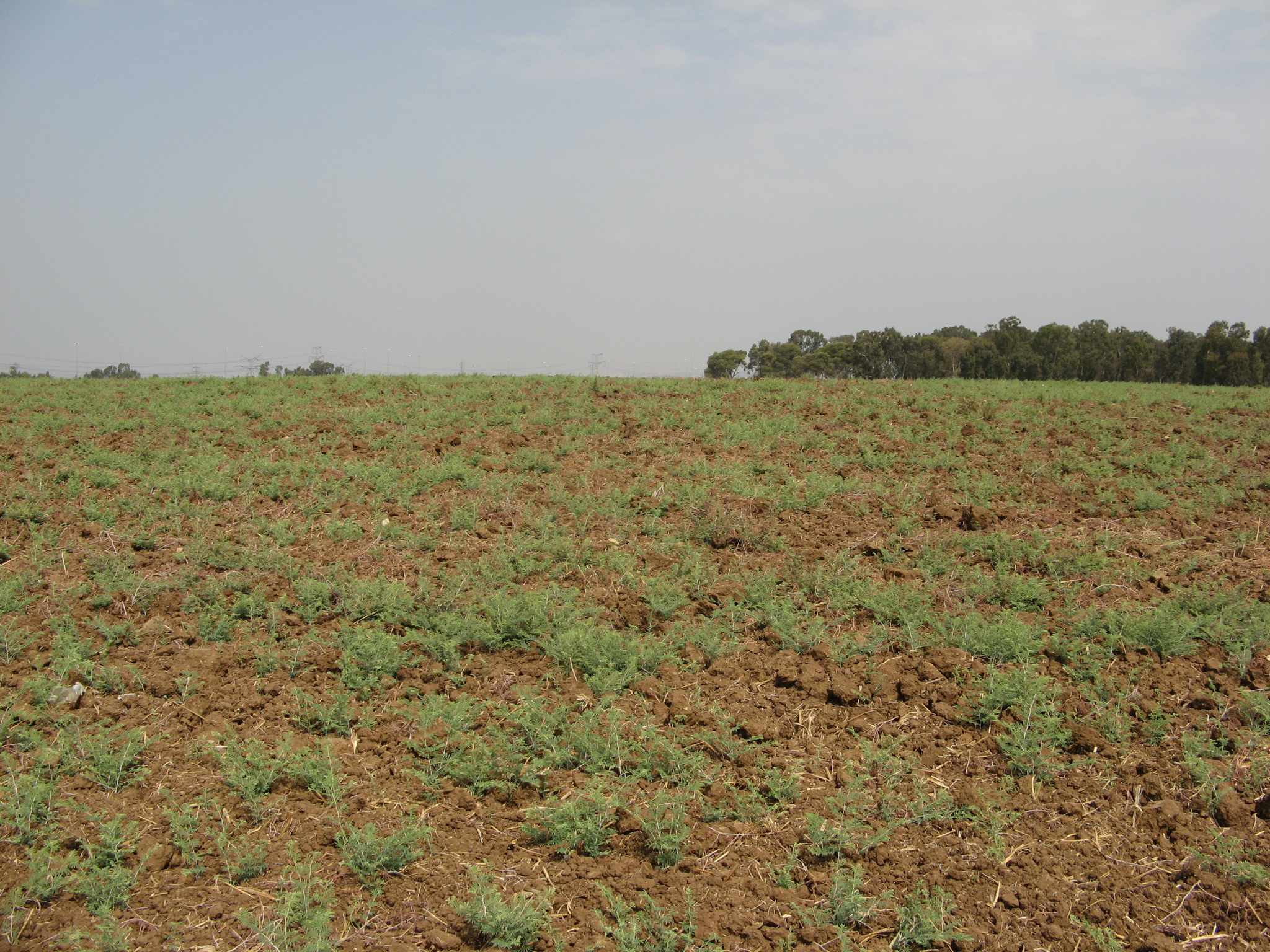
Field left uncultivated in observance of the shmita year near Rosh HaAyin (2007)

According to the laws of shmita, land owned by Jews in the Land of Israel is left unfarmed. The law does not apply to land in the Diaspora. Any naturally growing produce was not to be formally harvested, but could have been eaten by its owners, as well as left to be taken by poor people, passing strangers, and beasts of the field. While naturally growing produce such as grapes growing on existing vines can be harvested, it cannot be sold or used for commercial purposes; it must be given away or consumed. Personal debts are considered forgiven at sunset on 29 Elul. Since this aspect of shmita is not dependent on the land, it applies to Jews both in Israel and elsewhere.

As produce grown on land in Israel owned by Jewish farmers cannot be sold or consumed, fruits and vegetables sold in a shmita year may be derived from five sources:

- Produce grown during the sixth year, to which the laws of the seventh year do not apply.
- Produce grown on land owned by non-Jewish (typically, Arab) farmers in Israel.
- Produce grown on land outside the halakhic boundaries of Israel (chutz la'aretz).
- Produce (mainly fruits) distributed through the storehouse of the rabbinical court.
- Produce grown in greenhouses.

There is a requirement that shevi'it produce be consumed for personal use and cannot be sold or put in trash. For this reason, there are various special rules regarding the religious use of products that are normally made from agricultural produce. Some authorities hold that Hanukkah candles cannot be made from shevi'it oils because the light of Hanukkah candles is not supposed to be used for personal use, while Shabbat candles can be because their light can be used for personal use. For similar reasons, some authorities hold that if the Havdalah is performed using wine made from shevi'it grapes, the cup should be drunk completely and the candle should not be dipped into the wine to extinguish the flame as is normally done.

The otzar beit din system is structured in such a way that biur remains the responsibility of members of individual households and hence warehoused produce does not have to be moved to a public place or reclaimed at the biur time. Households only have to perform biur on produce they receive before the biur time, not on produce they receive after it.

Because the Orthodox rules of Kashrut have strictures requiring certain products, such as wine, to be produced by Jews, the leniency of selling one's land to non-Jews is unavailable for these products, since these strictures would render the wine non-Kosher. Accordingly, wine made from grapes grown in the land of Israel during the shmita year is subject to the full strictures of shmita. New vines cannot be planted. Although grapes from existing vines can be harvested, they and their products cannot be sold.

While obligatory to the Orthodox as a matter of religious observance, observance of the rules of shmita is voluntary so far as the civil government is concerned in the contemporary State of Israel. Civil courts do not enforce the rules. A debt would be transferred to a religious court for a document of prosbul only if both parties voluntarily agreed to do so. Many non-religious Israeli Jews do not observe these rules, although some non-religious farmers participate in the symbolic sale of land to non-Jews to permit their produce to be considered kosher and sellable to Orthodox Jews who permit the leniency. Despite this, during shmita, crop yields in Israel fall short of requirements so importation is employed from abroad.

== Talmudic references ==
Tractate Shevi'it, the fifth tractate of Seder Zeraim ("Order of Seeds") of the Mishnah, deals with the laws of leaving the fields of the Land of Israel to lie fallow every seventh year; the laws concerning which produce may, or may not be eaten during the Sabbatical year; and with the cancellation of debts and the rabbinical ordinance established to allow a creditor to reclaim a debt after the Sabbatical year. The tractate comprises ten chapters in the Mishna and eight in the Tosefta and has thirty-one folio pages of Gemara in the Jerusalem Talmud. Like most tractates in the order of Zeraim, there is no Babylonian Talmud for this tractate.

According to the Talmud, observance of the Sabbatical year is of high accord, and one who does not do so may not be allowed to be a witness in a beth din (rabbinical court). Nonetheless, Rabbinic Judaism has developed Halakhic (religious legal) devices to be able to maintain a modern agricultural and commercial system while giving heed to the biblical injunctions. Such devices represent examples of flexibility within the Halakhic system.

Hillel the Elder, in the first century BCE, used the rule that remittance of debts applies only to debts between Jews, to develop a device known as prozbul in which the debt is transferred to a beth din. When owed to the court rather than to an individual, the debt survives the Sabbatical year. This device, formulated early in the era of Rabbinic Judaism when the Temple in Jerusalem was still standing, became a prototype of how Judaism was later to adapt to the destruction of the Second Temple and maintain a system based on biblical law under very different conditions.

The rabbis of the Jerusalem Talmud created rules to impose order on the harvesting process including a rule limiting harvesters working on others' land to taking only enough to feed themselves and their families. They also devised a system, called otzar beit din, under which a rabbinical court supervised a communal harvesting process by hiring workers who harvested the fields, stored it in communal storage facilities, and distributed it to the community.

There exists a major difference of opinion between two Acharonim, Joseph Karo and Moses ben Joseph di Trani, as to whether produce grown on land in Israel which is owned by non-Jews also has sanctity. According to Karo, such produce has no sanctity and may be used and/or discarded in the same way as any produce grown outside of Israel. According to di Trani, the fact that this produce was grown in Israel, even by non-Jews, gives it sanctity, and it must be treated in the special ways detailed above.

Avrohom Yeshaya Karelitz, a noted Haredi halakhic authority who issued key rulings on Jewish agricultural law in the 1930s and 1940s, ruled like di Trani, holding that produce grown on land in Israel owned by non-Jews has sanctity. Karelitz's ruling was adopted first by the religious families of Bnei Brak and is popularly called Minhag Chazon Ish (the custom of the "Chazon Ish").

The rabbis of Jerusalem, on the other hand, embraced the opinion of Karo that produce farmed on land owned by non-Jews has no sanctity. This opinion is now called Minhag Yerushalayim "the custom of Jerusalem", and was adopted by many Haredi families, by British Mandate Palestine, and by the Chief Rabbinate of Israel.

These respective opinions are reflected in the way the various kashrut-certifying organizations publicize their shmita and non-shmita produce. The Edah HaChareidis, which follows Minhag Yerushalayim, buys produce from non-Jewish farms in Israel and sells it as "non-shmita produce". The Shearit Yisrael certifying organization, which subscribes to Minhag Chazon Ish, also buys from non-Jewish farmers in Israel, but labels the produce as such so that customers who keep Minhag Chazon Ish will treat these fruits and vegetables with appropriate sanctity.

== Shevi'it ==
In halakha (Jewish law), produce of the Seventh Year that is subject to the laws of shmita is called sheviit. Shevi'it produce has sanctity requiring special rules for its use:

- It can only be consumed or used (in its ordinary use) for personal enjoyment
- It cannot be bought, sold, or thrown out.
- It must be used in its "best" manner so as to ensure fullest enjoyment (For example, fruits that are normally eaten whole cannot be juiced).
- It can only be stored so long as naturally-growing plants of the given species can be eaten by animals in the fields. Once a particular species is no longer available in the field, one must rid one's house of it through a process known as biur.

By biblical law, Jews who own land are required to make their land available during the shmita to anyone who wishes to come in and harvest. If the land is fenced etc., gates must be left open to enable entrance. These rules apply to all outdoor agriculture, including private gardens and even outdoor potted plants. Plants inside a building are exempt. However, the rabbis of the Mishna and Jerusalem Talmud imposed rabbinic ordinances on harvesters to ensure an orderly and equitable process and to prevent a few individuals from taking everything. Harvesters on others' land are permitted to take only enough to feed themselves and their families.

== Aftergrowths ==
According to the Mosaic law, grains, fruits, legumes and vegetables are permitted to be eaten in the Seventh Year, yet must they be harvested in an irregular fashion, and only as much as a person might need for their sustenance, without the necessity of hoarding the fruits in granaries and storehouses. It is not permitted to make merchandise of Seventh Year produce. These restrictions are implied by the biblical verse, "You are not to reap the aftergrowth of your harvest, nor gather the grapes of your untended vines" (Leviticus 25:5), and by the supportive verse, "In the Seventh Year you must let it (i.e. the ground) rest and lie fallow, so that the poor among your people may eat from the field and the wild animals may consume what they leave. Do the same with your vineyard and olive grove" (Exodus 23:11). Grain cannot be harvested by using a sickle, nor can a person reap an entire field, or make use of beasts to separate the grain from the husks by treading. Grapes that are on the vine can be taken, sufficient for ones immediate needs, but they cannot be pressed in a winepress, but only in a small tub.

When certain farmers began to secretly sow their fields during the Seventh Year and to harvest what they had planted, and to cover-up their action by saying that such produce was a mere aftergrowth from last year's planting, the Sages of Israel were compelled to enact restrictions on Seventh Year produce and to forbid all aftergrowths (Hebrew: ספיחין) of grain, legumes and those vegetables which are usually planted by mankind, in order to put an end to their deception. Other rabbinic authorities prohibit only the aftergrowths of vegetables, but permit the aftergrowths of legumes and grain. They permitted, however, to pick the fruits of trees that grow of themselves during the Seventh Year, for one's immediate needs, and to gather such vegetables and herbs that are not normally planted by humans, such as wild rue (Ruta chalepensis), either wild asparagus (Asparagus aphyllus) or amaranth (Amaranthus blitum var. silvestre), purslane (Portulaca oleracea), wild coriander (Coriandrum sativum), parsley growing alongside rivers (Apium graveolens), garden rocket growing in marshlands (Eruca sativa), sweet marjoram (Majorana syriaca), white-leaved savory (Micromeria fruticosa), and the like of such things. Had any of these been kept watch over in the courtyard of a house, their aftergrowths would be forbidden to eat in the Seventh Year. Rabbi Nathan ben Abraham permits the gathering of aftergrowths of mustard greens (Sinapis alba) during the Seventh Year.

An ancient practice in the Land of Israel was to permit the gathering of spring onions which grew of themselves during the Seventh Year, after the first rains had fallen upon them and sprouted.

The laws governing Aftergrowths apply only to crops grown in the Land of Israel.

== Heter mechira ==
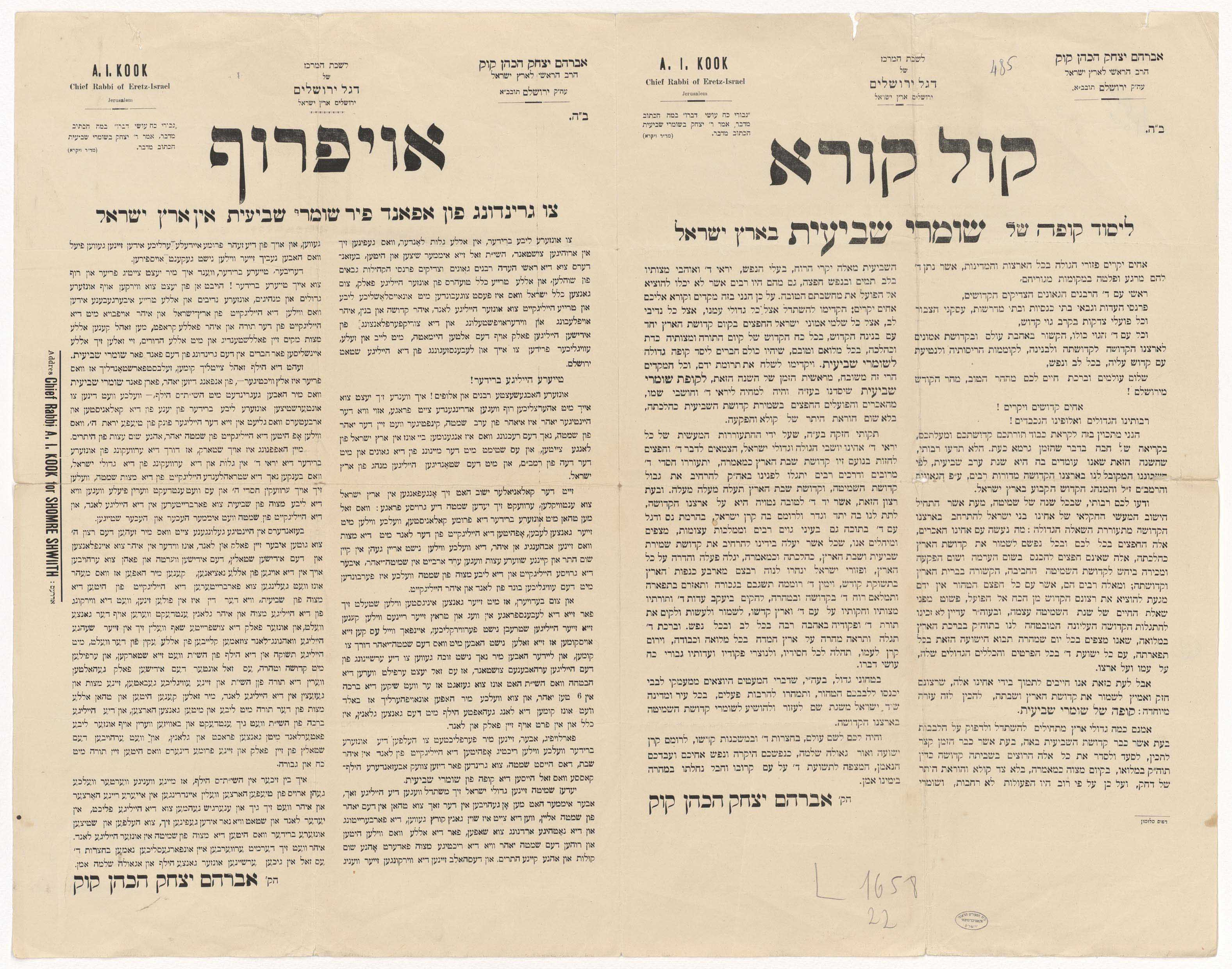
Proclamation of Chief Rabbi, Rav Avraham Yitzchak HaKohen Kook, Regarding The Importance of Shemitah Observance, and collecting for a communal fund to support those who observe shmita without compromise.

In the late 19th century, in the early days of Zionism, Rabbi Yitzchak Elchanan Spektor came up with a halakhic means of allowing agriculture to continue during the shmita year. After ruling in favor of Minhag Yerushalayim, that the biblical prohibition consists of not cultivating the land owned by Jews ("your land", Exodus 23:10), Rabbi Spektor devised a mechanism by which the land could be sold to a non-Jew for the duration of that year under a trust agreement. Under this plan, the land would belong to the non-Jew temporarily, and revert to Jewish ownership when the year was over. When the land was sold under such an arrangement, Jews could continue to farm it. Rabbi Abraham Isaac Kook, the first Chief Rabbi of British Mandate Palestine, allowed this principle, not as an ideal, but rather as a limited permit for individuals and times which are considered by Halacha of great need ("b'shas hadchak"), which became known as the heter mechira (lit. "sale permit"). Rabbi Kook explained in a lengthy responsum that the ideal is not to rely on the leniency of heter mechira, but rather to observe shmita according to all opinions. He noted that he himself did not rely on the leniency, it was intended only in a limited time of great need, for those unable to observe the shmita without the leniency.

The heter mechira was accepted by Modern Orthodox Judaism and is one of the classic examples of the Modern Orthodox approach toward adapting classical Jewish law to the modern world. However, this approach has not been universally accepted in the Orthodox community and has met with opposition, particularly from Haredi poskim (authorities of Jewish law).

In contemporary religious circles these rabbinic leniencies have received wide but not universal acceptance. In Israel, the Chief Rabbinate obtains permission from all farmers who wish to have their land sold. The land is then legally sold to a non-Jew for a large sum of money. The payment is made by a cheque post-dated to after the end of the Sabbatical year. When the cheque is returned or not honoured at the end of the year the land reverts to its original owners. Thus, the fields can be farmed with certain restrictions.

Although the Orthodox Union's Kashrut Division accepts Minhag Yerushalayim and hence regards the produce of land owned by non-Jews as ordinary produce, it does not currently rely on the heter mechira because of doubts about whether the trust arrangement involved effects a valid transfer of ownership.

Some Haredi farmers do not avail themselves of this leniency and seek other pursuits during the shmita year.

== Storehouse of the rabbinical court ==
The ancient idea of an otzar beit din (storehouse of the rabbinical court) is mentioned in the Tosefta (Sheviit 8, 1). Under an otzar beit din, a community rabbinical court supervises harvesting by hiring workers to harvest, store, and distribute food to the community. Members of the community pay the beth din, but this payment represents only a contribution for services, and not a purchase or sale of the food. This Talmudic device was revived in modern times as an alternative to the heter mechira.

Because under this approach land cannot be sown but existing plants can be tended and harvested, the approach is applied to orchards, vineyards, and other perennial crops. A beit din, or rabbinical court supervising the process, hires farmers as its agents to tend and harvest the crops, and appoints the usual distributors and shopkeepers as its agents to distribute them. Individual consumers appoint the court and its designees as their agents and pay monies to court-appointed designees as agents of the court. Thus, under this approach, a legal arrangement is created whereby the crops themselves are never bought or sold, but rather people are merely paid for their labor and expenses in providing certain services. In modern Israel, the badatz is notable for adapting and supervising such arrangements.

The Orthodox Union notes that "to some, the modern-day otzar might seem to be nothing more than a legal sleight of hand. All the regular players are still in place, and distribution rolls along as usual. However, in reality, it is identical only in appearance as prices are controlled, and may correspond only to expenses, with no profit allowed. In addition, the otzar beit din does not own the produce. Since it is simply a mechanism for open distribution, any individual is still entitled to collect produce from a field or orchard on his own. Furthermore, all agents of the beit din are appointed only if they commit to distributing the produce in accordance with the restrictions that result from its sanctity."

== Biur ==
Under the rules of the shmita, produce with Sabbatical sanctity (shevi'it) can only be stored as long as plants of the same species (e.g. plants sprouting by themselves) are available to animals in the fields. Once a species is no longer available in the land, halakha requires that it be removed, made ownerless, and made available to anyone who wishes to take it through a procedure called biur.

The Orthodox Union describes the contemporary application of the rules of biur as follows:

On the appointed day, one must remove all the relevant produce, and all products containing such produce, from his home and take it to a public area such as a sidewalk. Once there, the individual declares the produce in front of three people who do not live with him. He then waits to give the witnesses a chance to claim the produce. Once they have taken what they want, he is permitted to reclaim whatever remains. It is permissible to choose three people whom one knows will not claim the produce for themselves, even though they are legally entitled to.

Thus, while the obligation of making one's produce available to the public and permitted to all takers can be performed in such a way as to minimize the risk that this availability will actually be utilized, this risk cannot be eliminated. The community at large, including members of the poor, must be afforded some opportunity to take the produce.

Biur only applies to produce that has shevi'it sanctity. For this reason, it does not apply to produce grown under the heter mechira for those who accept it. (Under the reasoning of the heter mechira the shmita does not apply to land owned by non-Jews, so its produce does not have shevi'it sanctity.)

Wine prepared during the Seventh Year (with grapes grown in the same year) may be kept until Passover of the 1st-year cycle. Following the Passover, the wine can no longer be kept over.

== Kabbalah and Chassidut ==
When you eat and are satiated, you should bless God your Lord on the land The primary place where a Jew can eat in holiness is the Holy Land, which was given to us so we can sanctify its produce through the mitzvot such as tithes, the Sabbatical year, and so on. By eating in holiness, one can experience the Noam HaElyon, "Divine Pleasantness", which is mainly found in the Holy Land. When we bless God for our food, we draw the sanctity of the Land into our eating

All good and blessing are the life of Jewish people. "Israel could be in death" without this "spiritual-life", i.e. Holy air of Eretz Israel; Rashi teaches that all Jewish people can say that God has done the Creation and has stated ha'Aretz as gift to Israel: if Nations want to take this Land we must teach that in past time all World was "Reign of Kushit" in fact "now all Eretz Israel is in the hand of Jewish people."

According to the Chassidut, eating is not only a way to stay alive but even a necessity so that the soul can continue to be strongly inspired by the study of the Torah and the prayer that the Jew performs every day: this means that something material, the food – food can in fact be from the "mineral, vegetable or animal kingdoms" – becomes "sublimated" to enter the sacred area of devotional service to God.

Love God your Lord, hear His voice, and devote yourselves to Him. For He is your life and the length of your days, enabling you to dwell upon the Land that God your Lord promised your fathers, Abraham, Isaac and Jacob, that He would give them If someone separates himself from the Torah, it is as if he separates from life itself (Zohar I, 92a). A person's life force comes principally from the Torah (Likutey Moharan II, 78: 2). Thus, the more one devotes himself to the Torah by studying and observing it, the more is his life enhanced

The main alliance between God and the Jewish people consists in continuous Blessings, transcribed also in the Torah; from Moses to Aaron up to the Levites and to the Jewish people as a whole, in the Torah the pact of revelation is established to bind them forever in the Land which can only be that place where it is possible to realize the Kingdom of God.

Just as rain, dew and strong winds provide life to the world, so does the Torah

— Rashi

The event of the gift of the Torah at Mount Sinai involved the whole world, in fact even the angels and other nations were witnesses or spectators of this miraculous event. With Avodah this event is perfectly consolidated until the messianic vision of the reconstruction of Third Temple of Jerusalem.

Ruach ("wind") also means "spirit"— in particular, the "spirit of Divine inspiration". Moses' words, which exemplify the power of the spirit of the tzaddik, bring Divine inspiration to all Jews

— Rebbe Nachman of Breslov

Shmita is therefore abundance of Nature until it becomes holy.

== In modern Israel ==
The first shmita year in the modern State of Israel was 1951–1952 (5712 in the Hebrew calendar). Subsequent shmita years have been 1958–1959 (5719), 1965–1966 (5726), 1972–1973 (5733), 1979–1980 (5740), 1986–1987 (5747), 1993–1994 (5754), 2000–2001 (5761), 2007–2008 (5768), 2014–2015 (5775), and 2021–2022 (5782). The last shmita year began on Rosh Hashanah in September 2021, corresponding to the Hebrew calendar year 5782. The 50th year of the land, which is also a Shabbat of the land, is called "Yovel" in Hebrew, which is the origin of the Latin term "Jubilee", also meaning 50th. According to the Torah, observance of Jubilee only applies when the Jewish people live in the land of Israel according to their tribes. Thus, with the exile of the tribes of Reuben, Gad, and Menashe (about 600 BCE) Jubilee has not been applicable. In 2000, Sefardic Chief Rabbi Eliyahu Bakshi-Doron withdrew religious certification of the validity of permits for the sale of land to non-Jews during the shmita year following protests against his endorsement of the leniency by members of the Haredi community.

=== Hydroponics ===
Authorities who prohibit farming in Israel generally permit hydroponics farming in greenhouses structured so that the plants are not connected to the soil. As a result, hydroponics use has been increasing in Haredi farming communities.

=== Shmita 2007–2008 ===
During the 2007–2008 shmita, the Chief Rabbinate of Israel attempted to avoid taking a potentially divisive position on the dispute between Haredi and Modern Orthodox views about the correctness of the heter mechira leniency by ruling that local rabbis could make their own decisions about whether or not to accept this device as valid. The Israel Supreme Court, however, ordered the Chief Rabbinate to rescind its ruling and to devise a single national ruling. The Israel Supreme Court opined that divergent local rulings would be harmful to farmers and trade and could implicate competition. The issue of secular courts ordering the rabbinate to rule in particular ways on religious matters aroused a debate within the Knesset. Israeli wineries often address this issue by making separate batches of shmita wine, labeled as such, and giving away bottles of shmita wine as a free bonus to purchasers of non-shmita wine.

== In the First Temple period ==
Sabbatical years in the pre-exilic period, according to Thiele's approach (First Temple and earlier) Sabbatical years start in Tishri
Year	Event
1406 BCE	Entry into land; beginning of counting for Jubilee and Sabbatical years, as calculated from observance of 17th Jubilee in 574/73 BCE and (independently) from 1 Kings 6:1.
868/867 BCE	Public reading of the Law in 3rd year of Jehoshaphat. Also a Jubilee year, the 11th.
700/699 BCE	Sabbatical year after the departure of the Assyrian army in late 701 or early 700 BCE.
623/622 BCE	Public reading of the Law. Also a Jubilee year, the 16th.
588/587 BCE	Release of slaves at beginning of the Sabbatical year 588/587 (Tishri 588).
Summer 587 BCE	Fall of Jerusalem to the Babylonians in the latter part of the Sabbatical year 588/587.
Tishri 10, 574 BCE	Ezekiel's vision of a restored temple at beginning of 17th Jubilee year, which was also a Sabbatical year.

=== The Sabbatical year 868/867 BCE ===
Another public reading of the Law, suggesting a Sabbatical year, took place in the third year of Jehoshaphat (2 Chronicles 17:7–9). According to the widely accepted biblical chronology of Edwin Thiele, Jehoshaphat began a coregency with his father Asa in 872/871 BCE, and his sole reign began in 870/869. The passage about the reading of the law in Jehoshaphat's third year does not specify whether this is measured from the beginning of the coregency or the beginning of the sole reign, but since the two synchronisms to Jehoshaphat's reign for the kings of Israel (1 Kings 22:51, 2 Kings 3:1) are measured from the start of the sole reign, it would be reasonable to determine Jehoshaphat's third year in the same way. In Thiele's system, this would be 867/866. However, Thiele's years for the first few kings of Judah has come under criticism as being one year too late, because of problems that appear in the reign of Ahaziah and Athaliah that Thiele never solved. Therefore, in 2003, an article by Rodger Young showed that the texts that Thiele could not reconcile were in harmony when it was assumed that Solomon died before Tishri 1 in the (Nisan-based) year in which the kingdom divided, rather than in the half-year after Tishri 1 as assumed, without explanation, by Thiele. In 2009 Leslie McFall, who is recognized in Finegan's Handbook of Biblical Chronology as the foremost living interpreter of Thiele's work, agreed with Young's correction that moved dates for Jehoshaphat and the preceding kings of Judah up one year, as have some other recent works by evangelicals and creationists studying this the field. With this resolution to Thiele's problem, the year in which Jehoshaphat had the Law read to the people was 868/867. This is 294 years, or 42 Sabbatical cycles, before Ezekiel's Jubilee. The 42 Sabbatical cycles would make six Jubilee cycles, so it was also a Jubilee year. It is of some passing interest that in 1869, long before the breakthroughs of Valerius Coucke and Thiele that solved the basic problems of how the biblical authors were measuring the years, Ferdinand Hitzig stated that the occasion for Jehoshaphat's proclamation was because it was a Jubilee year.

=== The Sabbatical year 700/699 BCE ===
If 574/573 marked a Jubilee, and if the Sabbatical cycles were in phase with the Jubilees, then 700/699 BCE, the year often mentioned as a possible Sabbatical year because of the land lying fallow during that year (Isaiah 37:30, 2 Kings 19:29), was also a Sabbatical, 126 years or 18 Sabbatical cycles before Ezekiel's Jubilee. Assuming a 49-year cycle, the nearest Jubilee would have been in 721 BC, inconsistent with attempts to place a Jubilee after the Sabbatical year at this time. If a 50-year Jubilee cycle is assumed, the nearest Jubilee would be 724/723, and then assuming that a Sabbatical cycle began in the year following a Jubilee, neither 701/700 nor 700/699 would be a Sabbatical year.

Could the passages in Isaiah 37 and 2 Kings 19 be referring to two voluntary fallow years? This might be possible if the Jubilee year was a 50th year separate from the seventh Sabbatical/shmita year. Young presents a linguistic argument against this interpretation, as follows:

Others have imagined that Isa 37:30 and its parallel in 2 Kgs 19:29 refer to a Sabbatical year followed by a Jubilee year, since the prophecy speaks of two years in succession in which there would be no harvest. But the first year could not be a Sabbatical year, because in it the people were allowed to eat "what grows of itself", for which the Hebrew word is ספיח . In Lev 25:5 the reaping of the ספיח is forbidden during a Sabbatical year. Whatever the exact meaning is for this word, its use in Isaiah's prophecy and its prohibition in Lev 25:5 means that the first year of the Isaiah and Second Kings passages could not have been a Sabbatical year. This rules out the possibility that the passage is dealing with a Sabbatical year followed by a year of Jubilee. The proper understanding of the passage is that the harvest of the first year had been destroyed by the Assyrians, and the defeat of the Assyrian army came too late in the year to allow sowing that year. The destruction of the Assyrian host came the night after the giving of the prophecy (2 Kgs 19:35), so the reason that sowing and reaping were forbidden for the next year must have been because that year, the second year of the prophecy, was going to be a Sabbatical year.

=== The Sabbatical year 623/622 BCE ===
It has already been mentioned that the Babylonian Talmud (Megillah 14b) and the Seder Olam (ch. 24) mentioned a Jubilee in Josiah's 18th year, 623/622 BCE. With the proper assumption of a 49-year cycle for the Jubilee, the Jubilee would be identical to the seventh Sabbatical year, so that the Jubilee and Sabbatical cycles would never be out of synchronization. 623/622 BCE would therefore also have been a Sabbatical year. In Sabbatical years, the Mosaic code specified that the Law was to be read to all the people (Deuteronomy 31:10–11). Although this commandment, like so many others, was probably neglected throughout most of Israel's history, it was observed in Josiah's 18th year (2 Kings 23:1,2).

=== The Sabbatical year 588/587 BCE ===
Various scholars have conjectured that Zedekiah's release of slaves, described in Jeremiah 34:8–10, would likely have been done at the start of a Sabbatical year. Although the original Mosaic legislation stated that an indentured servant's term of service was to end six years after the service started (Deuteronomy 15:12), later practice was to associate the Sabbatical year, called a year of release (shemitah) in Deuteronomy 15:9, with the release of slaves. Based on a chronological study of Ezekiel 30:20–21, Nahum Sarna dated Zedekiah's emancipation proclamation to the year beginning in Tishri of 588 BCE. Although Zedekiah's release of slaves could have occurred at any time, the occurrence of a Sabbatical year at just this time provides some insight into the background that probably influenced Zedekiah's thinking, even though the release was later rescinded.

The year 588/587 BCE was also the year that Jerusalem fell to the Babylonians, consistent with the Babylonian records for the reign of Amel-Marduk and the Scriptural data regarding Jehoiachin and Zedekiah. This is in keeping with the statement in Seder Olam chapter 30, properly translated as discussed above, that put the burning of the First Temple, as well as the Second, in the "latter part" of a Sabbatical year. The statement of the Seder Olam in this regard is repeated in the Tosefta (Taanit 3:9), the Jerusalem Talmud (Ta'anit 4:5), and three times in the Babylonian Talmud (Arakin 11b, Arakin 12a, Ta'anit 29a). An example of the caution that must be exercised when consulting English translations is shown by the Soncino translation in Arakin 11b, that the Temple was destroyed "at the end of the seventh [Sabbatical] year", compared to Jacob Neusner's translation of the corresponding passage in the Jerusalem Talmud, that it was "the year after the Sabbatical year".

=== The Sabbatical year 574/573 BCE ===
A convenient starting place for the study of Sabbatical years in the time of the First Temple is the Jubilee that the Babylonian Talmud (tractate Arakin 12a), and also the Seder Olam (chapter 11), say was the 17th and which began at the time that Ezekiel saw the vision the occupies the last nine chapters of his book. Although many of the chronological statements of the two Talmuds, as well as in the Seder Olam that preceded them, have been shown to be unhistorical, this particular statement has considerable evidence to support its historicity. One of these evidences is the consistency of this reference with the other Jubilee mentioned in the Talmud and the Seder Olam (ch. 24), which is placed in the 18th year of Josiah (Megillah 14b). Ezekiel's vision occurred in the 25th year of the captivity of Jehoiachin (Ezekiel 40:1). Babylonian records state that Amel-Marduk (the biblical Evil-Merodach) began to reign in October 562 BCE, and 2 Kings 25:27 says that it was in the twelfth month of this accession year (Adar, 561 BCE) and in Jehoiachin's 37th year of captivity that Jehoiachin was released from prison. By Judean reckoning, Jehoiachin's 37th year would then be 562/561 BCE. His 25th year, the year in which Ezekiel saw his vision, is therefore determined as 574/573 BCE, i.e. the year that began in Tishri of 574. Josiah's 18th year, at which time the Talmud says there was another Jubilee, began in 623 BCE, as can be determined from Babylonian records dating the Battle of Carchemish, which occurred shortly after Josiah was slain in his 31st year (2 Kings 22:3, 23:29). This is 49 years before Ezekiel's Jubilee, providing evidence that the Jubilee cycle was 49 years, not 50 years as is accepted by many interpreters, but which has been challenged by recent work such as the study of Jean-François Lefebvre. Zuckermann also held that the Jubilee cycle was 49 years, as did Robert North in his notable study of the Jubilees. A fuller discussion of the reasons that the Jubilee cycle was 49 years can be found in the Jubilee article, where it is pointed out that the known chronological methods of the Talmuds and the Seder Olam were incapable of correctly calculating the time between Josiah's 18th year and the 25th year of the captivity of Jehoiachin, indicating that these remembrances of Jubilees were historical, not contrived.

That Ezekiel saw his vision at the beginning of a Jubilee year is also shown by his statement that it was "in the twenty-fifth year of our captivity, on Rosh Hashanah, on the tenth day of the month…;" (Ezekiel 40:1). It was only in a Jubilee year that Rosh Hashanah (New Year's Day) came on the tenth of Tishri (Leviticus 25:9), the Day of Atonement. The Seder Olam, in relating that Ezekiel's vision was at the beginning of a Jubilee, does not cite the part of Ezekiel 40:1 that says it was Rosh Hashanah and the tenth of the month, indicating that the fact that a Jubilee was commencing was based on historical remembrance, not on just the textual argument regarding Rosh Hashanah being on the tenth of the month. Ezekiel also says it was 14 years after the city fell; 14 years before 574/573 BCE was 588/587 BCE, in agreement with "the 25th year of our captivity".

=== Sabbatical years in the Second Temple period ===
Sabbatical years of Second Temple period (randomly mentioned by Josephus)
Year	Event
150 Seleucid era = 162–161 BCE	Sabbatical year. Second year of Antiochus Eupator's reign. Judas Maccabeus lays siege to the garrison in the citadel at Jerusalem, with the Jewish runagates.
178 Seleucid era = 134–133 BCE	Sabbatical year. Ptolemy slays the brethren of John Hyrcanus.
271 Seleucid era = 41–40 BCE	Sabbatical year. Jerusalem captured by Herod and Sosius.

Sabbatical years have been used to fix the exact time of historical events, as shown in traditional Jewish chronology, but which are rarely understood by modern chroniclers of ancient history.

The first modern treatise devoted to the Sabbatical (and Jubilee) cycles was that of Benedict Zuckermann. Zuckermann insisted that for Sabbatical years after the Babylonian exile "it is necessary to assume the commencement of a new starting-point, since the laws of Sabbatical years and Jubilees fell into disuse during the Babylonian captivity, when a foreign nation held possession of the land of Canaan. ... We therefore cannot agree with chronologists who assume an unbroken continuity of septennial Sabbaths and Jubilees." The Seder Olam (ch. 30) is explicit that this was the case, i.e. that the returned exiles had a renewed start of tithes, Sabbatical years, and Jubilee years. The first instance of a Sabbatical year treated by Zuckermann was Herod the Great's siege of Jerusalem, as described by Josephus. Zuckermann assigned this to 38/37 BCE, i.e. he considered that a Sabbatical year started in Tishri of 38 BCE. Next, he considered John Hyrcanus's siege of Ptolemy in the fortress of Dagon, which is described both in Josephus (Antiquities. 13.8.1/235; The Jewish War 1.2.4/59–60) and 1 Maccabees (16:14–16), and during which a Sabbatical year started; from the chronological information provided in these texts, Zuckermann concluded that 136/135 BCE was a Sabbatical year. The next event to be treated was Antiochus Eupator's siege of the fortress Beth-zur (Ant. 12.9.5/378, 1 Maccabees 6:53), dated by Zuckermann to 163/162 BCE. However, he also remarked on the difficulties presented to this figure by the text in 1 Maccabees, which would seem to date the siege one year later, and so he decided to leave it out of consideration. The final text considered by Zuckermann was a passage in the Seder Olam that relates the destruction of the Second Temple to a Sabbatical year, an event that is known from secular history to have happened in the summer of 70 CE. Zuckermann interpreted the Seder Olam text as stating that this happened in a year after a Sabbatical year, thus placing a Sabbatical in 68/69 CE.

All these dates as calculated by Zuckermann are separated by an integral multiple of seven years, except for the date associated with the siege of Beth-zur. Furthermore, his chronology is consistent with that accepted by the geonim (medieval Jewish scholars) and the calendar of Sabbatical years used in present-day Israel. All of this would seem to be strong evidence in favor of Zuckermann's scheme. Nevertheless, some problems have been recognized, beyond just the question of the siege of Beth-zur, which was one year too late for Zuckermann's calendar. A consistent problem has been the ambiguity alleged in some of the passages, notably of Josephus, where it has been questioned, for example, when Josephus started the regnal years of Herod the Great. In a study the chronology of all Herod's reign, Andrew Steinmann presents arguments in favor of dating Herod's capture of Jerusalem in 10 Tishre of 37 BCE, i.e. just after the Sabbatical year of 38/37, based on references to the activities of Mark Antony and Sosius, Herod's helpers, in Cassius Dio (49.23.1–2) and also on other considerations. This date is in agreement with Ben Zion Wacholder's chronology. Therefore, many modern scholars have adopted a Sabbatical year calendar for the Second Temple period that is one year later, although there are many prominent scholars who still maintain a cycle consistent with Zuckermann's conclusion of a 38/37 BCE Sabbatical year.

Among those who have advocated an adjustment to Zuckermann's chronology, the most extensive studies in its favor have been those of Ben Zion Wacholder. Wacholder had access to legal documents from the time of the Bar Kokhba revolt that were not available to Zuckermann. The arguments of Wacholder and others to support the calendar one year later than that of Zuckermann are rather technical and will not be presented here, except for two items to which Zuckermann, Wacholder, and other scholars have given great weight: 1) the date of Herod's capture of Jerusalem from Antigonus, and 2) the testimony of the Seder Olam relating the destruction of the Second Temple to a Sabbatical year. Wacholder gives the dates of post-exilic Sabbatical years in the following table:

Sabbatical Years in the post-exilic period
Year	Event
331/330 BCE	Remission of taxes under Alexander the Great for Sabbatical years.
163/162 BCE	Second battle of Beth-Zur; summer 162 BCE.
135/134 BCE	Murder of Simon the Hasmonean.
37/36 BCE	Herod conquers Jerusalem on 10 Tishri (Day of Atonement) just after end of Sabbatical year 37/36 BCE.
41/42 CE	Recital of Deuteronomy 7:15 by Agrippa I in a post-Sabbatical year, making the Sabbatical year 41/42.
55/56 CE	A note of indebtedness from Wadi Murabba'at in 2nd year of Nero, 55/56 CE, indicating 55/56 as a Sabbatical year.
69/70 CE	Destruction of Jerusalem in the latter part (motsae, "going-out") of the Sabbatical year 69/70.
132/133 CE	Rental contracts of Simon bar Kosiba indicating 132/133 as a Sabbatical year.
433/434 and 440/441 CE	Three fourth- and fifth-century tombstones near Sodom indicating 433/434 and 440/441 CE were Sabbatical years.

Subsequent to Wacholder's study, Yoram Tsafrir and Gideon Foerster published the results of archaeological excavations at Beth Shean in the Levant that verified a record from the Cairo Geniza that gave 749 CE as the year for the "Earthquake of the Sabbatical Year". According to the Geniza record, the earthquake occurred on 23 Shevat, 679 years after the destruction of the Second Temple; this is January 18, 749 CE in the Julian calendar.

The Sabbatical-year earthquake of 749 CE
Jan. 749 CE	"Sabbatical year earthquake": 23 Shevat=18 Jan., 749 CE.

=== Seder Olam and the Sabbaticals associated with the destructions of the Temples ===
The principal author of the Seder Olam, Rabbi Jose, was a pupil of the famous Rabbi Akiva. Jose was a young man when the Romans destroyed Jerusalem and burned the Temple. On such an important issue as the year in which the Temple was destroyed, it would be logical that Jose's ideas were taken from his mentor and his mentor's contemporaries.

Chapter 30 of the Seder Olam gives the year that both Temples were destroyed as be-motsae shevi'it (במוצאי שבעית). Heinrich Guggenheimer's recent translation renders this phrase as "at the end of a Sabbatical year", thus unambiguously supporting the Wacholder calendar that starts a Sabbatical year in the fall of 69 CE. The problem, however, is that many translations of the Seder Olam render the phrase as "in the year after a Sabbatical year" or its equivalent. This was the sense adopted by Zuckermann when citing the Seder Olam as supportive of his calendar of Sabbatical years. The same Hebrew phrase is used in the Babylonian Talmud when citing this passage from the Seder Olam, and some modern translations of the Talmud into English translate the phrase in the sense given by Guggenheimer, while others translate it in the sense of "the year after". The Seder Olam uses the same phrase regarding a Sabbatical year for the destruction of both Temples, so that its testimony in this regard is important for dating the shemitot in both pre-exilic and post-exilic times. Therefore, it would seem necessary to closely examine the phrase in the original Hebrew when making chronological decisions. Unfortunately, this was not done, either by Zuckermann, Wacholder, or Finegan, when citing the Seder Olam's testimony as decisive for their particular calendars of Sabbatical years. Most interpreters have simply relied on an existing translation, and that translation may have been unduly influenced by an attempt to make the translation consistent with the chronology of the geonim that placed the end of the Second Temple in a post-Sabbatical year.

At least one study has addressed this problem, arguing from both a linguistic standpoint and from a study of related texts in the Seder Olam that the phrase ve-motsae sheviit should be translated as something close to "and in the latter part of a Sabbatical year", consistent with Guggenheimer's translation and Wacholder's calendar. This recent study argues that a comparative study of the word motsae (literally, "goings-out") does not support any sense of "after" ("after a Sabbatical year"). Further, the reference of the Seder Olam to a Sabbatical year associated with Jehoiachin is in keeping with a Sabbatical year when the First Temple was burned a few years later, but the Seder Olam would be in conflict with itself if the phrase in chapter 30 was interpreted as saying that the burning was in a post-Sabbatical year.

=== Jubilee and Sabbatical years as a long-term calendar for Israel ===
The Jubilee and Sabbatical year provided a long-term means for dating events, a fact that must have become obvious soon after the legislation was put into effect. It is of some interest, then, that the Babylonian Talmud (tractate Sanhedrin 40a,b) records that in the time of the judges, legal events such as contracts or criminal cases were dated according to the Jubilee cycle, the Sabbatical cycle within the Jubilee cycle, and the year within the Sabbatical cycle. The Samaritan community apparently used this method of dating as late as the 14th century CE, when an editor of one of the writings of the Samaritans wrote that he finished his work in the sixty-first Jubilee cycle since the entry into Canaan, in the fourth year of the fifth Sabbatical of that cycle. These cases of usage of the Jubilee/Sabbatical cycles make no provision for the possibility of the Sabbatical cycles being out of phase with the Jubilee cycles, which is additional evidence that the Jubilee was contemporaneous with the seventh Sabbatical year.

== See also ==
- Convertible husbandry, an agricultural system where the field is alternately seeded for grain and left fallow.
- Hakhel
- Jewish holidays
- Sabbath
- The Lord's Release
