= Jubilee (biblical) =

Year at the end of seven cycles of shmita (sabbatical years)

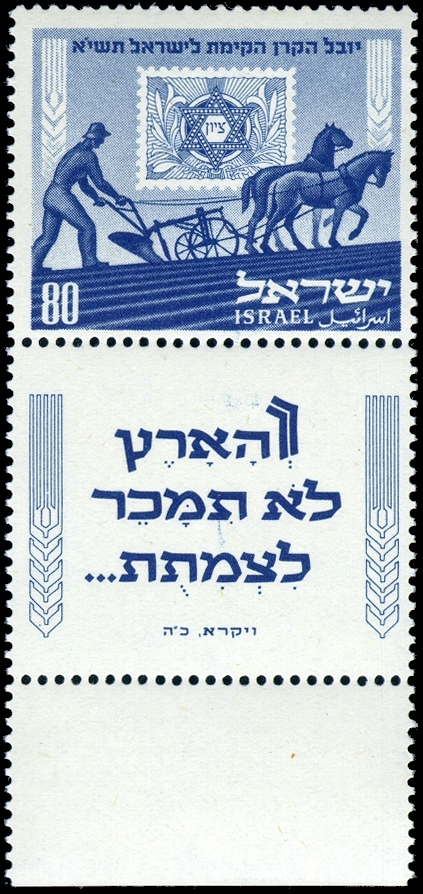
Israeli stamp commemorating the Jewish National Fund and quoting Leviticus 25:23: "The land must not be sold permanently…"

The Jubilee (Hebrew: יובל yōḇel; Yiddish: yoyvl) is the year that follows the passage of seven "weeks of years" (seven cycles of sabbatical years, or 49 total years). This fiftieth year deals largely with land, property, and property rights. According to regulations found in the Book of Leviticus, certain indentured servants would be released from servitude, some debts would be forgiven, and everyone was supposed to return to their own property in jubilee years.

Rabbinic literature mentions a dispute between the Sages and Rabbi Yehuda over whether it was the 49th year (the last year of seven sabbatical cycles, referred to as the Sabbath's Sabbath), or whether it was the following (50th) year.

The biblical rules concerning sabbatical years are still observed by many religious Jews in Israel, but the practices prescribed for the Jubilee year have not been observed for many centuries. According to current interpretation of Torah in contemporary Rabbinic Judaism, the observance of the Jubilee year only applied when the people of Israel were living in the Land of Israel according to their tribes. Therefore, in one sense Jubilee has not been applicable since the destruction of the Kingdom of Israel in 722 BCE by Neo-Assyrian king Sargon II.

In modern Israel, the Jubilee rules concerning land redistribution have been rendered functionally obsolete by secular Israeli land law. The vast majority of land in Israel is owned by the Israel Land Authority (until 2009, the Israel Land Administration), an agency of the Ministry of Construction and Housing, and the private non-profit Jewish National Fund.

== Etymology ==
The Septuagint used the phrase "a trumpet-blast of liberty" (ἀφέσεως σημασία apheseôs sêmasia), and the Vulgate used the Latin iobeleus; the English term Jubilee derives from the Latin term. The Latin term derives from the Hebrew term יוֹבֵל yōḇēl, used in the Masoretic Text, which also meant ram and ram's horn trumpet; the Jubilee year was announced by a blast on a shofar, an instrument made from a ram's horn, during that year's Yom Kippur.

== Origin and purpose ==
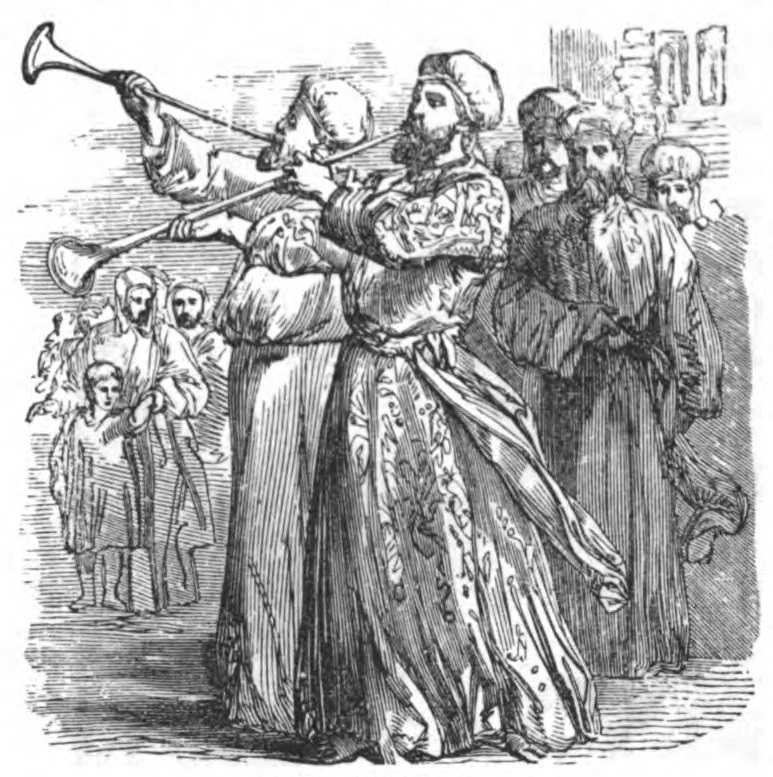
The Levites sound the trumpet of Jubilee (1873 illustration)

Leviticus 25:8–13 states:

You shall count off seven Sabbaths of years, seven times seven years; and there shall be to you the days of seven Sabbaths of years, even forty-nine years. Then you shall sound the loud trumpet on the tenth day of the seventh month. On the Day of Atonement you shall sound the trumpet throughout all your land. You shall make the fiftieth year holy, and proclaim liberty throughout the land to all its inhabitants. It shall be a jubilee to you; and each of you shall return to his own property, and each of you shall return to his family. That fiftieth year shall be a jubilee to you. In it you shall not sow, neither reap that which grows of itself, nor gather from the undressed vines. For it is a jubilee; it shall be holy to you. You shall eat of its increase out of the field. In this Year of Jubilee each of you shall return to his property. (WEB)

Ancient Near Eastern societies regularly declared noncommercial debts void, typically at the coronation of a new king or at the king's order. Biblical scholars once argued that the Jubilee was an obvious development of the Sabbatical year. Rather than waiting for the 50th or 49th year, the Deuteronomic Code requires that Hebrew slaves be liberated during their 7th year of service, as does the Covenant Code, which some textual scholars regard as pre-dating the Holiness code; the Book of Ezekiel, which some textual scholars also regard as earlier than the Holiness Code, refers to a year of liberty (שנת דרור), during which property is returned to the original owner (or their heirs), (earlier written mentioning in Sum: ama-gi, ama-ar-gi, 'return to the mother') but the word דרור is used by Jeremiah to describe the release of slaves during the Sabbatical year, which various scholars take to imply that Ezekiel must have been referring to the sabbatical year. Scholars suspect that the transfer of these regulations to 49th or 50th year was a deliberate attempt to parallel the fact that Shavuot is 50 days after Passover, and follows seven weeks of harvest; this parallel is regarded as significant in Kabbalah.

According to the documentary hypothesis, originally proposed by Julius Wellhausen, the Biblical chapters that contain the Jubilee and Sabbatical-year legislation (chapters 25 and 27 of Leviticus) were part of the so-called "P" or Priestly Code that Wellhausen believed represented the last stage in the development of Israel's religion. Wellhausen dated those chapters to a late exilic or post-exilic period though many modern proponents of the Documentary Hypothesis have arrived at different datings.

Wellhausen's theory that the Jubilee and Sabbatical-year legislation was written in the exilic or post-exilic period, specifically after the time of Ezekiel, has always been challenged by scholars who have maintained the traditional position of Judaism and Christianity for the Mosaic authorship of Leviticus. Recently, however, the theories of Wellhausen and others who date the Jubilee and Sabbatical-year legislation to the exilic period or later have also been challenged by scholars who generally do not have a conservative view of the Bible. Yehezekel Kaufmann has argued that the book of Ezekiel quotes from the Sabbatical and Jubilee legislation of the Book of Leviticus, which must have been in existence before Ezekiel's writings. This argument has been expanded by Risa Levitt Kohn. Kohn examined in detail the 97 terms and phrases that are shared between Ezekiel and the Priestly Code. She concludes:

In each of these examples, the direction of influence moves from P to Ezekiel. A term or expression with a positive connotation in P takes on a negative overtone in Ezekiel. Ezekiel parodies P language by using terms antithetically. It is virtually impossible to imagine that the Priestly Writer would have composed Israelite history by transforming images of Israel's apostasy and subsequent downfall from Ezekiel into images conveying the exceptional covenant and unique relationship between Israel and YHWH. Indeed, it is difficult to imagine that the Priestly Writer could have turned Ezekiel's land of exile (ארץ מגוריהם) into Israel's land of promise, Israel's enemies (קהל עמים) in to a sign of fecundity, or Israel's abundant sin (במאד מאד) into a sign of YHWH's covenant. It is, however, plausible that Ezekiel, writing in exile, re-evaluated P's portrayal of Israel's uniqueness, cynically inverting these images so that what was once a "pleasing fragrance to YHWH" symbolizes impiety and irreverence.

John Bergsma provides a further argument against an exilic or post-exilic date for the codifying of the Jubilee and Sabbatical-year legislation, saying that the Sitz im Leben (life situation) of the exilic or post-exilic period is not at all addressed by this legislation.

Finally, if the only purpose of the jubilee legislation was to serve as a pretext for the return of the exiles' lands, certainly much simpler laws than the jubilee could have been written and ascribed to Moses. All that would be necessary is a short statement mandating the return of property to any Israelite who returned after being exiled. In point of fact, precisely such brief, pointed laws are extant in the Mesopotamian codes, for example, the code of Hammurabi § 27 and the Laws of Eshnuna § 29. But on the contrary, the jubilee legislation never addresses the situation of exile. The only form of land alienation addressed in the text is sale by owner. If the priesthood in the early Persian period really wanted a legal pretext for the return of lost lands, they would surely have written themselves a law that directly addressed their situation.

Bergsma therefore points out the incongruity of Wellhausen's ascribing an exilic or post-exilic date to the Jubilee and Sabbatical-year legislation, since this would conflict with the Sitz im Leben of Israel during, and after, the exile. In addition, Bergsma shows that the problem that this legislation was addressing was a problem recognized by the kings of Babylon in the second millennium BC, which naturally suggests the possibility of a much earlier date of codification. These Babylonian kings (to whom could be added Ammi-Saduqa) occasionally issued decrees for the cancellation of debts and/or the return of the people to the lands they had sold. Such "clean slate" decrees were intended to redress the tendency of debtors, in ancient societies, to become hopelessly in debt to their creditors, thus accumulating most of the arable land into the control of a wealthy few. The decrees were issued sporadically.

Economist Michael Hudson maintains that the Biblical legislation of the Jubilee and Sabbatical years addressed the same problems encountered by these Babylonian kings, but the Biblical formulation of the laws presented a significant advance in justice and the rights of the people. This was due to the "clean slates" now being codified into law, rather than relying on the whim of the king. Furthermore, the regular rhythm of the Sabbatical and Jubilee years meant that everyone would know when the next release was due, thereby giving fairness and equity to both creditor and debtor. Hudson therefore maintains that not only was the Levitical legislation a significant advance over the prior attempts to deal with indebtedness, but this legislation was also eminently practical, in contradiction to many Biblical interpreters who are not economists and who have labeled it "utopian".

== Regulations ==
The biblical regulations concerning the Jubilee year appear in Leviticus 25. According to these regulations, the Jubilee was to be sounded once 49 years had been counted, raising an ambiguity over whether the Jubilee was within the 49th year, or followed it as an intercalation in the 7-year sabbatical cycles; scholars and classical rabbinical sources are divided on the question.

The biblical requirement is that the Jubilee year was to be treated like a Sabbatical year, with the land lying fallow, but also required the compulsory return of all property to its original owners or their heirs, except the houses of laymen within walled cities, in addition to the manumission of all Israelite indentured servants.

The biblical regulations state that the land was to rest a "Sabbath" when the Children of Israel came to the land God was giving them Israel. The Seder Olam Rabbah (second century AD), stated that this verse meant that the counting was not to start until after the Israelites had gained control of Canaan, which the Seder Olam, based upon received tradition, placed at 14 years after their entry into the land. This interpretation has been largely adopted in later rabbinic scholarship. One reason for this interpretation of the Levitical text was that if counting started before the land was completely conquered, it would require the Israelites to return the land to the Canaanites within 50 years; similar nationalistic concerns about the impact of the Jubilee on land ownership have been raised by Zionist settlers. From a legal point of view, the Jubilee law effectively banned sale of land as fee simple, and instead land could only be leased for no more than 50 years. The biblical regulations go on to specify that the price of land had to be proportional to how many years remained before the Jubilee, with land being cheaper the closer it is to the Jubilee.

== Length of the cycle ==
Since the 49th year was already a sabbatical year, the land was required to be left fallow during it, but if the 50th year also had to be kept fallow, as the Jubilee, then no new crops would be available for two years, and only the summer fruits would be available for the following year, creating a much greater risk of starvation overall; Judah the Prince contended that the jubilee year was identical with the sabbatical 49th year. However, the majority of classical rabbis believed that the biblical phrase hallow the fiftieth year, together with the biblical promise that there would be three years worth of fruit in the sixth year, implies that the jubilee year was the 50th year. The opinion of the Geonim, and generally of later authorities, was that prior to the Babylonian captivity the Jubilee was the intercalation of the 50th year, but after the captivity ended the Jubilee was essentially ignored, except for the blast of the shofar, and coincided with the sabbatical 49th year; the reason was that the Jubilee was only to be observed when the Jews controlled all of Canaan, including the territories of Reuben and Gad and the eastern half-tribe of Manasseh.

The length of the Jubilee cycle continues to be of interest to modern scholarship, as does the question of the practicality of the legislation, and whether it was ever put into effect on a nationwide basis. Regarding the length of the cycle, three significant scholarly studies devoted to the Jubilee and Sabbatical years agree that it was 49 years, while disagreeing somewhat on the interpretation of the other issues involved. These major studies were those of Benedict Zuckermann, Robert North, and Jean-François Lefebvre. The reasons given by these authors to support a 49-year cycle are both textual (examining all relevant Biblical texts) and practical.

Calendrical document 4Q319 from the Dead Sea Scrolls "represents a calendrical system based on the weekly rotation of the twenty-four priestly courses during a six-year period and constructed into six consecutive Jubilees, i.e. 294 years.".

=== Textual and practical considerations ===
An example of the textual argument is given by North in his comparison of Leviticus 23:15–16 with Leviticus 25:8–11. The first passage establishes the timing, in days, for the Festival of Weeks (Shavuot), while the second prescribes the timing, in years, for the Jubilee. In the first passage, the start of counting for the Festival of Weeks is said to be "the day after the Sabbath" (mimaharat ha-shabat, Leviticus 23:15), and is to end "the day after the seventh Sabbath" (mimaharat ha-shabat ha-sheviyit, Leviticus 23:16). These seven weeks would constitute 49 days in most modern methods of reckoning. Nevertheless, verse 16 says that they are to be reckoned as 50 days. This method of reckoning (sometimes called "inclusive numbering") is fairly common in Scripture; for example, the Feast of Tabernacles is to last for seven days (Leviticus 23:34–36), but the last day is called the eighth day (v. 36). North found this comparison between Leviticus 23 (Feast of Weeks) and Leviticus 25 (Jubilees) to be "the strongest possible support for the forty-ninth year" as the Jubilee year. His conclusion that the Jubilee was identical with the seventh Sabbatical year was followed by Lefebvre, for this as well as additional reasons.

The consideration that the Jubilee was identical with the seventh Sabbatical year solves the various practical problems, as also addressed by these authors. If the Jubilee were separate from, and following the seventh Sabbatical year, then there would be two fallow years in succession. Lefebvre opines, however, that there is no support in Scripture for two voluntary fallow years in succession, even though some have misinterpreted Leviticus 25:21–22 as if this refers to a Jubilee year following a Sabbatical year, which is not the sense of the passage. Lefebvre shows that this cannot be the case because planting is mentioned for the eighth year; it is the year after a Sabbath, a year in which planting and harvesting resume. Another practical problem that would occur if the Jubilee cycle were 50 years is that, after the first cycle, the Jubilee and Sabbatical cycles would be out of phase unless the seventh Sabbatical cycle was stretched to eight years. But Scripture gives no instructions for making such an adjustment. Instead, it is assumed that the two cycles will always be in phase so that the shofar can be sounded in the seventh year of the seventh Sabbatical cycle. The hole in Lefebvre's argument is that the Leviticus passage specifically refers to consecrating the "fiftieth year"

In contrast, the consideration that the Jubilee year is an intercalated year separate and distinct from the Sabbatical cycles resolves an issue of the requirement for observation of the Torah of both Leviticus 25:3 and Leviticus 25:11. For in the former passage, the command is that sowing and pruning must occur for six consecutive years, whereas in the latter, the command is to neither sow, nor reap nor gather from untended vines in the Jubilee year. If the Jubilee year is the 50th year as confirmed by Leviticus 25:10–11, it must necessarily be a separate year from the first 49 years comprising the whole of the first seven Sabbatical cycles. Therefore it cannot be identical with the seventh Sabbatical year, as 49 does not equal 50. Were the Jubilee year to be considered identical with year one of the following Sabbatical cycle, the requirement of observing six consecutive years of sowing and pruning could not be observed as only five years would therefore be available for sowing and reaping, not the specified six as Leviticus 25:3 requires. A lot of the misunderstanding comes from not carefully reading the original Hebrew text. There was no requirement in the Law to observe 6 consecutive years of sowing. The command stated that you may sow for six years but in the seventh year the land must observe a sabbath rest. It would be a double negative to command the land to be sowed for six years in cases of famine and war.

=== Historical considerations ===
Although not cited by these authors, two historical arguments also argue for a 49-year cycle. The first is that the Samaritans celebrated a 49-year cycle. Although the Samaritans stopped counting for the Jubilee some hundreds of years ago, according to a recent report an effort is underway to determine the date when counting ceased in order to resume. The counting will again be according to a 49-year cycle. A second historical argument has been presented to the effect that the two instances of a Jubilee mentioned in the Babylonian Talmud (tractates Arakin 12a and Megillah 14b) appear to be proper historical remembrances, because the known calculation methods of rabbinic scholarship were incapable of correctly calculating the dates of the Jubilees mentioned. Rabbinic (Talmudic) scholarship always assumed non-accession reckoning for kings, whereby the first partial year of a king was double-counted both for him and as the last year of the deceased king. This reckoning would give 47 years from the Jubilee mentioned in the 18th year of Josiah (Megillah 14b) to the Jubilee that took place 14 years after Jerusalem fell to the Babylonians (Arakin 12a), whereas the correct difference was 49 years (623 BC to 574 BC). This has been presented as additional evidence that the cycle was 49 years, and further that the cycles were being measured until the last Jubilee in the days of Ezekiel, when the stipulations of the Jubilee year, long neglected except in the counting of the priests, could no longer be observed because the people were captive in a foreign land.

== Date when counting began ==
The Seder Olam Rabbah recognized the importance of the Jubilee and Sabbatical cycles as a long-term calendrical system, and attempted at various places to fit the Sabbatical and Jubilee years into its chronological scheme. As mentioned above, the Seder Olam put forth the idea that the counting for these cycles was deferred until 14 years after entry into the land. The reasons for this are given in Seder Olam chapter 11. In Joshua chapter 14, Caleb mentions that he was 40 years old when he was sent out as a spy in the second year of the 40-year wilderness journey, and his present age was 85, which meant he received his inheritance seven years after entering Canaan. Rabbi Jose assumed that everyone else received their inheritance when Caleb did, or had already received it, so that the allotment of the land to the tribes was finished at this time. Because the division of the land took seven years, the conquest that followed must also have taken seven years. "One has to say that 14 years Israel spent at Gilgal, seven when they were conquering and seven when they were distributing." Then, after putting up the Tabernacle at Shiloh, "At that moment, they started to count years for tithes, Sabbatical years, and Jubilee years."

Another explanation has been offered for Rabbi Jose's postponement of counting until 14 years had elapsed. In this same chapter 11 of the Seder Olam, Rabbi Jose stated (for unknown reasons) that Israel's time in its land must have lasted an integral number of Jubilee periods. If this were true, one of those periods should have ended at the beginning of the exile in 587 BC. Yet Rabbi Jose also believed that Ezekiel 40:1 marked the beginning of the seventeenth Jubilee, and this was 14 years after the city fell. In other words, the Jubilee came 14 years too late, according to the idea that the time in the land must comprise an integral number of Jubilee cycles. Rodger Young proposes that the knowledge of when a genuine Jubilee was due was the real reason for the supposition of a delay before the start of counting:

The reason for the fourteen-year delay in Seder 'Olam 11 is that Rabbi Yose (primary author of the Seder 'Olam) had the idée fixe that the total time that Israel spent in its land must come out to an exact number of Jubilee cycles. If that had been the case, then we should have expected that 587 BC, when the exile began, would have been at the end of a Jubilee period. However, Rabbi Yose cited Ezek 40:1 as designating the time of the seventeenth Jubilee, and since he knew this was fourteen years after the city fell, he presumed that counting had been delayed for fourteen years so that he could account for the fourteen years between the fall of the city and the observance of the seventeenth Jubilee. He also mentioned the previous Jubilee, in the time of Josiah. As much as he would have liked to put these last two Jubilees fourteen years earlier in order to be consistent with his idée fixe, Rabbi Yose could not do it because he knew these were historical dates, not dates that came from his own calculation.

An alternative account is that counting started at the entry into the land. This follows from a straightforward reading of the relevant text in Leviticus:

The LORD then spoke to Moses at Mount Sinai, saying, "Speak to the sons of Israel, and say to them, 'When you come into the land which I shall give you, then the land shall have a sabbath to the LORD. Six years you shall sow your field, and six years you shall prune your vineyard and gather in its crop, but during the seventh year the land shall have a sabbath rest, a sabbath to the LORD ... You are also to count off seven sabbaths of years for yourself, seven times seven years, so that you have the time of the seven sabbaths of years, namely, forty-nine years. You shall then sound a ram's horn abroad on the tenth day of the seventh month; on the day of atonement you shall sound a horn all through your land. You shall thus consecrate the fiftieth year and proclaim a release through the land to all its inhabitants. It shall be a jubilee for you (Leviticus 25:1–4, 8–10, NASB).

The Talmud states that the people of Israel counted 17 Jubilees from the time they entered the Land of Canaan until their exile at the destruction of the First Temple. If counting is measured back 17 cycles from Ezekiel's Jubilee (Ezekiel 40:1) that began in Tishri of 574 BC, based on Thiele's computation, the first year of the first cycle would have been 1406 BC. According to the religious calendar that started the year in Nisan, and in accordance with Joshua 5:10 that places the entry in the land in Nisan, Nisan of 1406 BC is the month and year when counting started. But 1406 BC is the year of entry into the land that is traditionally derived by another method, namely taking Thiele's date of 931/930 BC for the start of the divided kingdom after Solomon's death, in conjunction with 1 Kings 6:1 (Solomon's fourth year was 480th year of Exodus-era), to derive the date of the Exodus in 1446 BC. The method of determining the date of the Exodus and entry into Canaan from the Jubilee cycles is independent of the method of deriving these dates from 1 Kings 6:1, yet the two methods agree.

A different approach is taken in the Talmud (Arakhin 12a–b) which, like Seder Olam, assigns only 410 years to the First Temple, preceded by 480 years from the exodus to its building by Solomon (1 Kings 6:1) in 832 BC (by the rabbinic accounting) and its destruction in 422 BC. The Talmud (Arakhin 12b) accounts for 40 years of wandering in the wilderness, and 7 years taken to conquer the land of Canaan and 7 years to divide the land among the tribes, putting the first Jubilee cycle precisely 54 years after the exodus (i.e. in 1258 BC), and saying that the people of Israel counted 17 Jubilees from the time they entered the Land of Canaan until their departure, and that the last Jubilee occurred 14 years after the First Temple's destruction (i.e. in 408 BC). Talmudic exegete, Rashi, explains in the Talmud (Arakhin 12b) that the year of the First Temple's destruction (422 BC) was actually the 36th year in the Jubilee cycle, and that fourteen years later (408 BC) would have been the next Jubilee. This time span, taken together (from 1258 BC to 408 BC), accrues to 850 years, during which time the people counted seventeen Jubilees.

The historian Josephus, however, had a different tradition, writing in his work Antiquities (10.8.5) that the First Temple stood 470 years, which would, of necessity, offset the number of Jubilee cycles. Moreover, Josephus' reckoning of the timeline of events does not always align with Seder Olam, the book on which rabbinic tradition is so dependent. The discrepancies between Josephus and Seder Olam have led some scholars to think that the dates prescribed in Seder Olam are only approximations, as Josephus brings down supportive evidence by making use of two basic epochs, the Olympiad era counting and the Seleucid era counting, drawn principally from other writers, to verify the historicity of many of these events. In spite of their differences in the general span of years, there is not necessarily disagreement between Josephus and Seder Olam when Josephus refers to dates of Sabbatical years during the Second Temple period, as the time-frame for these dates overlap those mentioned in Seder Olam (chapter 30) for the Grecian, Hasmonean, and Herodian periods.

== Theological significance ==
The text of the Book of Leviticus argues that the Jubilee existed because the land was the possession of Yahweh, and its current occupiers were merely aliens or tenants, and therefore the land should not be sold forever. Midrashic sources argue that the Jubilee was created to preserve the original division of land between the Israelite tribes, as evidenced by the rabbinical tradition that the Jubilee should not be imposed until the Israelites were in control of Canaan. Leviticus also states that the Israelites were the servants of Yahweh, which classical rabbis took as justification for the manumission of Israelite slaves at the Jubilee, using the argument that no man should have two masters, and thus, as the servants of Yahweh, the Israelites should not also be the servants of men.

A further theological insight afforded by the Jubilee cycles is explained in Andrew Steinmann's monograph on Biblical chronology. Steinmann has an extended discussion of the evidence for various pre-exilic Sabbatical years, and how they all occurred an integral number of seven-year periods before Ezekiel's Jubilee (see the Historical Sabbatical Years article). He also notes that the date of the entry into the land implied by Ezekiel's Jubilee (the seventeenth) is in exact agreement with the date calculated from 1 Kings 6:1 and Joshua 5:6. These chronological considerations are usually neglected in discussions of the legislation for the Jubilee and Sabbatical years, but Steinmann stresses their theological importance as follows:

This illustrates one of the principles stated in the preface to the present book: that some historical insights will remain obscured until the chronology of the period under discussion is determined properly. The Jubilee and Sabbatical cycles provide such historical insight. But they do more: they also offer theological insights on such important matters as the date and historicity of the Exodus and the origin of the Book of Leviticus. If, as has been argued, the times of the Jubilee and Sabbatical cycles were known all the time that Israel was in its land, and, further, that the only adequate explanation that has yet been given for Ezekiel's Jubilee being the seventeenth Jubilee is that the counting for these cycles actually started 832 years earlier, in 1406 BC, then it is logical to conclude the Lev 25–27, the texts that charter the Sabbatical years and the Jubilees, were in existence in the late fifteenth century BC.

== Policy implications ==
Despite the fact that the specific norms of the Jubilee were meant for an agrarian and ancient economy, it has been noted that its principles of economic justice remain relevant and can be adapted to the modern world. The periodic land redistribution mandated by the Jubilee was aimed at preventing excessive wealth inequality and democratizing private property, without abrogating either personal responsibility or incentives for prosperity. The Jubilee provides an economic structure that regularly dissolves large economic inequalities. Given that every fifty years almost every citizen in Ancient Israel was entitled to a plot of land — the main form of wealth at the time — the system seems to promote a form of Asset-based egalitarianism, embracing a universal basic capital or universal inheritance, which in turn could justify a Universal basic income. The norm of Leviticus 25:13, according to which everyone was supposed to return to their own property in the Jubilee years, coupled with the fact that land was initially equally distributed among the Israelites (Book of Numbers 26:51-54), provides additional grounding for Thomas Paine's idea of natural inheritance.

== See also ==
- Bank holiday
- Book of Jubilees
- Jewish holidays
- Jubilee in the Catholic Church
- Sed festival
- Yovel Zoosman (born 1988), Israeli basketball player
