= The Lord's Release =

Obligation of releasing debts in Deuteronomy

The Lord's Release (Latin: remissionis Domini, Hebrew: שמיטת כספים, shmitat kesafim = monetary remission) is the title given by Deuteronomy 15:2 in the Hebrew Bible to the obligation and practice of releasing debtors from their debts every seventh year within the seven-year agricultural cycle mandated by the Torah:

"Every creditor shall release that which he hath lent unto his neighbour; he shall not exact it of his neighbour and his brother; because the LORD's release hath been proclaimed."

The obligation only applied to the Israelites living in the Promised Land: it did not apply to foreigners. A similar obligation in relation to the release of Hebrew slaves who have served in slavery for seven years is described in Deuteronomy 15:12–18.

The term "the LORD's release" is used in the King James Version of the Bible and in the New King James Version and Revised Standard Version; other translations refer to the Year of Remission (Wycliffe Bible), the LORD's remission (New American Standard Bible) or Hashem’s Shemittah (Orthodox Jewish Bible). Albert Barnes' Notes on the Bible states that although most texts say "it is called the LORD’s release", the meaning is more likely to be that "it is proclaimed to be the LORD's release".

The Jamieson-Fausset-Brown Bible Commentary considered the release to be temporary: "Every creditor that lendeth ought unto his neighbour shall release it — not by an absolute discharge of the debt, but by passing over that year without exacting payment. The relief was temporary and peculiar to that year during which there was a total suspension of agricultural labor." Similarly, the seventeenth-century nonconformist Matthew Poole stated that the relief was temporary; you must "not absolutely and finally forgive it, but forbear it for that year". However, to theologian John Gill, the release was to be permanent: "it rather seems to be a full release, so as the payment of them might not be demanded, neither this year nor afterwards".
