= Jacob Brüll =

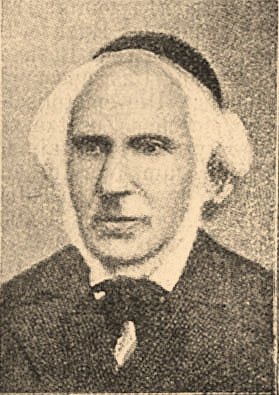
Jacob Brüll

Jacob Brüll (16 November 1812 – 29 November 1889) was a Czech talmudic scholar and rabbi.

== Life ==
Brüll was born on 16 November 1812 in Nový Rousínov, Moravia, Austrian Empire. He attended several yeshivot in Hungary (Bonyhád, Pressburg and Buda). He was ordained as a rabbi by Michael Wronick, rabbi of Nový Rousínov, and Nahum Trebitsch, the chief rabbi of Moravia. Later in his life, he married Trebitsch's daughter, Regina. He served as an assistant rabbi in Nový Rousínov, and then from 1843 until his death in 1889, he served as rabbi in Kojetín. He died on 29 November 1889 in Kojetín.

== Works ==
Brüll was renowned for his varied knowledge in rabbinic literature and published several scholarly works, including:

- Forschungen über Targumim und Midraschim (1851)
- Die Mnemonik des Talmud (1864)
- Mavo haMishnah, ed. 1 (1876), ed. 2 (1885). The second edition has been republished in Israel.
- Ben Zekunim (1889). This was published a week before he died.

Additionally, he made various contributions to Leopold Löw's periodical Ben Chananja (1858–1867) and Isaac Hirsch Weiss' Bet-Talmud (1881–1886).

== Students ==
Among his students were his sons Nehemiah (1843–1891), Adolf (1846–1908), and the renowned scholar David Kaufmann.
