= Josef Flesch =

- Born: 19 September 1781; Neu-Rausnitz, Moravia, Holy Roman Empire
- Died: 17 December 1839 (aged 58); Neu-Rausnitz, Moravia, Austrian Empire
- Writing career
- Language: Hebrew
- Literary movement: Haskalah

Josef Flesch (Yiddish: יוסף פלעש; 19 September 1781 – 17 December 1839) was Moravian writer, translator, and merchant. He has been called the "father of the Moravian Haskalah."

== Biography ==
Josef Flesch was born in Neu-Rausnitz, Moravia, the son of local rabbi Abraham Flesch. He attended yeshiva in Prague with his father's childhood friend, Baruch Jeitteles. After marrying the daughter of Salomon Berger in Leipnik in 1801 and spending three years in the house of his father-in-law, he returned to his hometown and joined his father's business.

He was a frequent contributor to the Bikkure ha-Ittim, and translated into Hebrew several of the writings of Philo, notably Quis rerum divinarum heres sit (under the title Ha-yoresh divre Elohim, Prague, 1830) and De vita Moysis (under the title Ḥayye Moshe, Prague, 1838). To the former work was added the oration which Flesch delivered at his father's funeral. His other publications include a Hebrew translation of philosopher Karl Heinrich Heydenreich, and a list of Jewish scientists under the title Reshimat anshe mofet (Prague, 1838).
