= Rousínov =

Town in South Moravian Region, Czech Republic

- Town
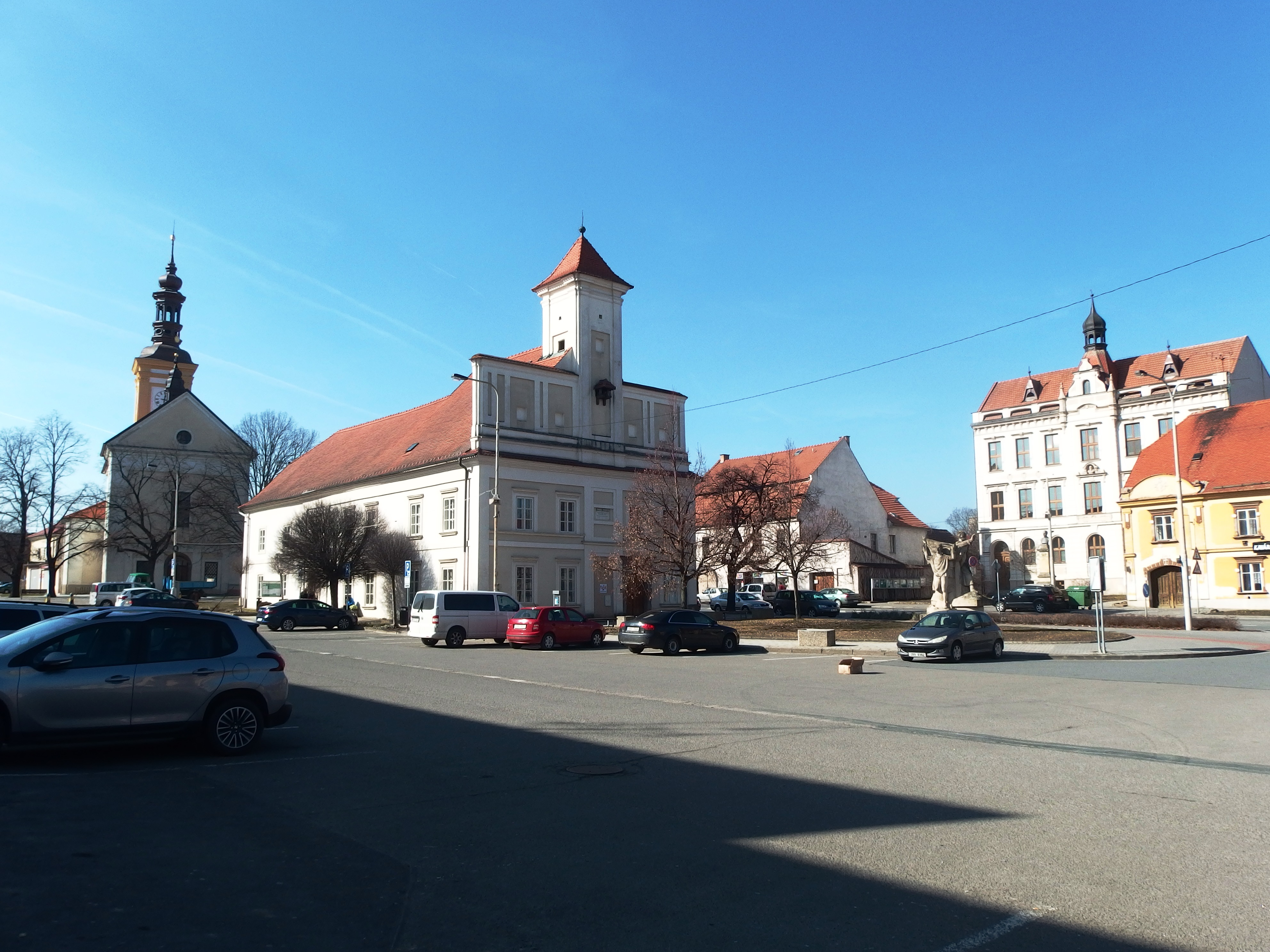
- Town square with Old Town Hall and Church of Saint Mary Magdalene

- Flag Coat of arms

- Location in the Czech Republic
- Coordinates: 49°12′5″N 16°52′56″E
- Country: Czech Republic
- Region: South Moravian
- District: Vyškov
- First mentioned: 1222

Government
  - Mayor: Jiří Lukášek

Area
  - Total: 23.05 km^{2} (8.90 sq mi)
- Elevation: 240 m (790 ft)

Population (2026-01-01)
  - Total: 5,948
  - Density: 258.0/km^{2} (668.3/sq mi)
- Time zone: UTC+1 (CET)
  - Summer (DST): UTC+2 (CEST)
- Postal code: 683 01
- Website: www.rousinov.cz

Rousínov (Czech pronunciation: [ˈrousiːnof]; until 1921 Nový Rousínov; German: Neu Raußnitz, Neuraussnitz) is a town in Vyškov District in the South Moravian Region of the Czech Republic. It has about 5,900 inhabitants.

== Administrative division ==
Rousínov consists of seven municipal parts (in brackets population according to the 2021 census):

- Rousínov (2,567)
- Čechyně (430)
- Královopolské Vážany (641)
- Kroužek (303)
- Rousínovec (744)
- Slavíkovice (713)
- Vítovice (319)

== Geography ==
Rousínov is located about 11 kilometres (7 mi) southwest of Vyškov and 15 km (9 mi) east of Brno. It lies mostly in the Vyškov Gate, but the southern part of the municipal territory extends into the Litenčice Hills and the northern forested part extends into the Drahany Highlands. The highest point of Rousínov, located at the northern municipal border, is at 430 m (1,411 ft) above sea level. The Rakovec Stream flows through the town.

== History ==
The first written mention of Rousínov is from 1222. In 1321, it was last referred to as a village. It belonged to the Špilberk estate. It became an important crossroads of trade routes from Vienna and from Olomouc. Rousínov was a royal town until 1559, when Ferdinand I sold the Špilberk estate.

The Jewish community existed here from the second half of the 15th century until 1919. The business activities of the Jews after the Thirty Years' War brought economic prosperity to the town.

Until 1945, the village of Čechyně belonged to the German-speaking enclave called Vyškov Language Island. The area was colonised by German settlers in the second half of the 13th century. The coexistence of Czechs and Germans was mostly peaceful, which changed only after 1935, when many Germans tended to Nazism. In 1945, the German-speaking population was expelled.

== Demographics ==
Historical population

| Year | Pop. | ±% |
|---|---|---|
| 1869 | 4,281 | — |
| 1880 | 4,122 | −3.7% |
| 1890 | 4,138 | +0.4% |
| 1900 | 4,146 | +0.2% |
| 1910 | 4,581 | +10.5% |

| Year | Pop. | ±% |
|---|---|---|
| 1921 | 4,815 | +5.1% |
| 1930 | 5,375 | +11.6% |
| 1950 | 4,920 | −8.5% |
| 1961 | 4,904 | −0.3% |
| 1970 | 4,767 | −2.8% |

| Year | Pop. | ±% |
|---|---|---|
| 1980 | 5,081 | +6.6% |
| 1991 | 4,910 | −3.4% |
| 2001 | 4,922 | +0.2% |
| 2011 | 5,315 | +8.0% |
| 2021 | 5,717 | +7.6% |

Source: Censuses

== Transport ==
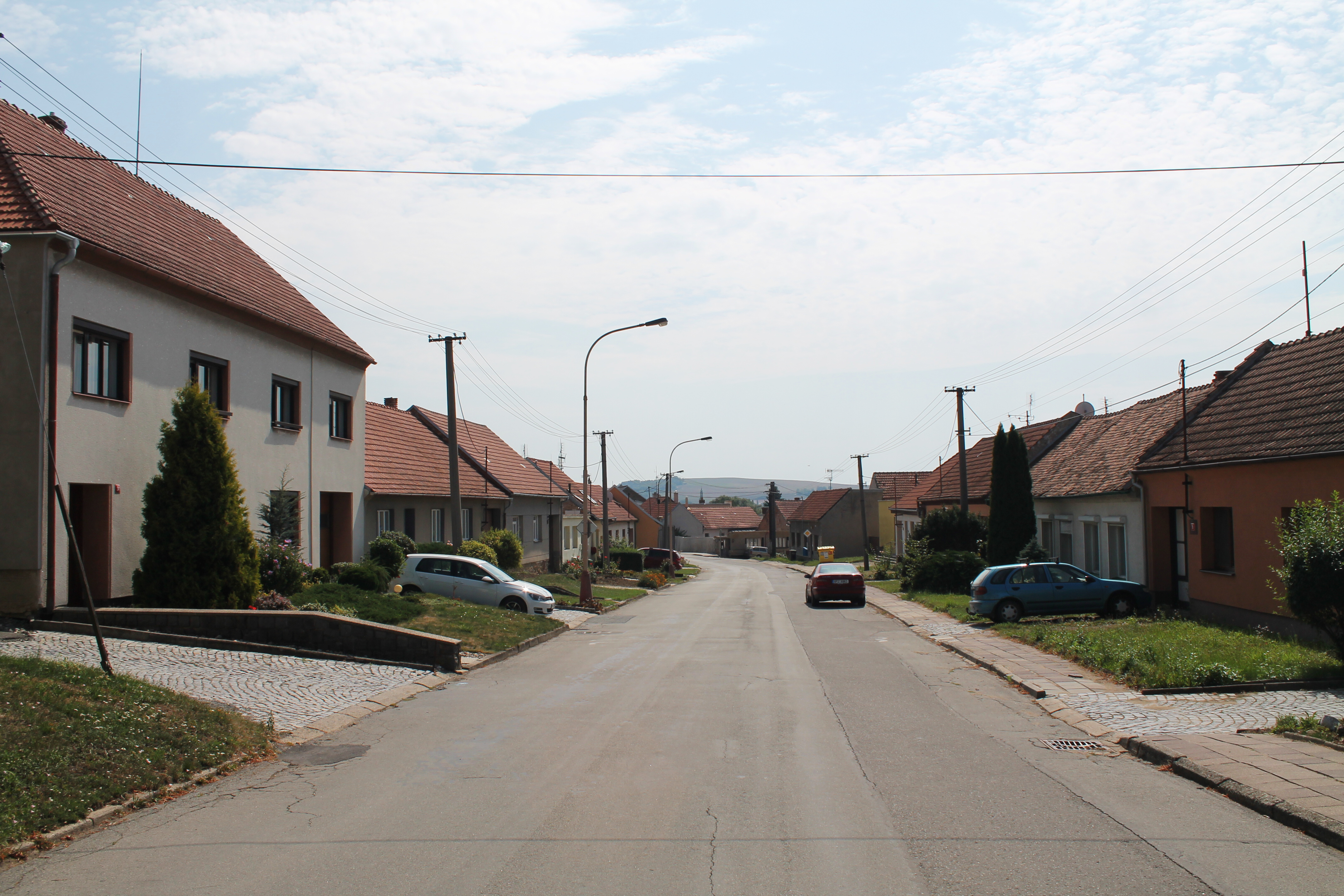
Centre of Královopolské Vážany

The D1 motorway from Brno to Ostrava runs around the town.

Rousínov is located on the railway line Brno–Olomouc.

== Sights ==
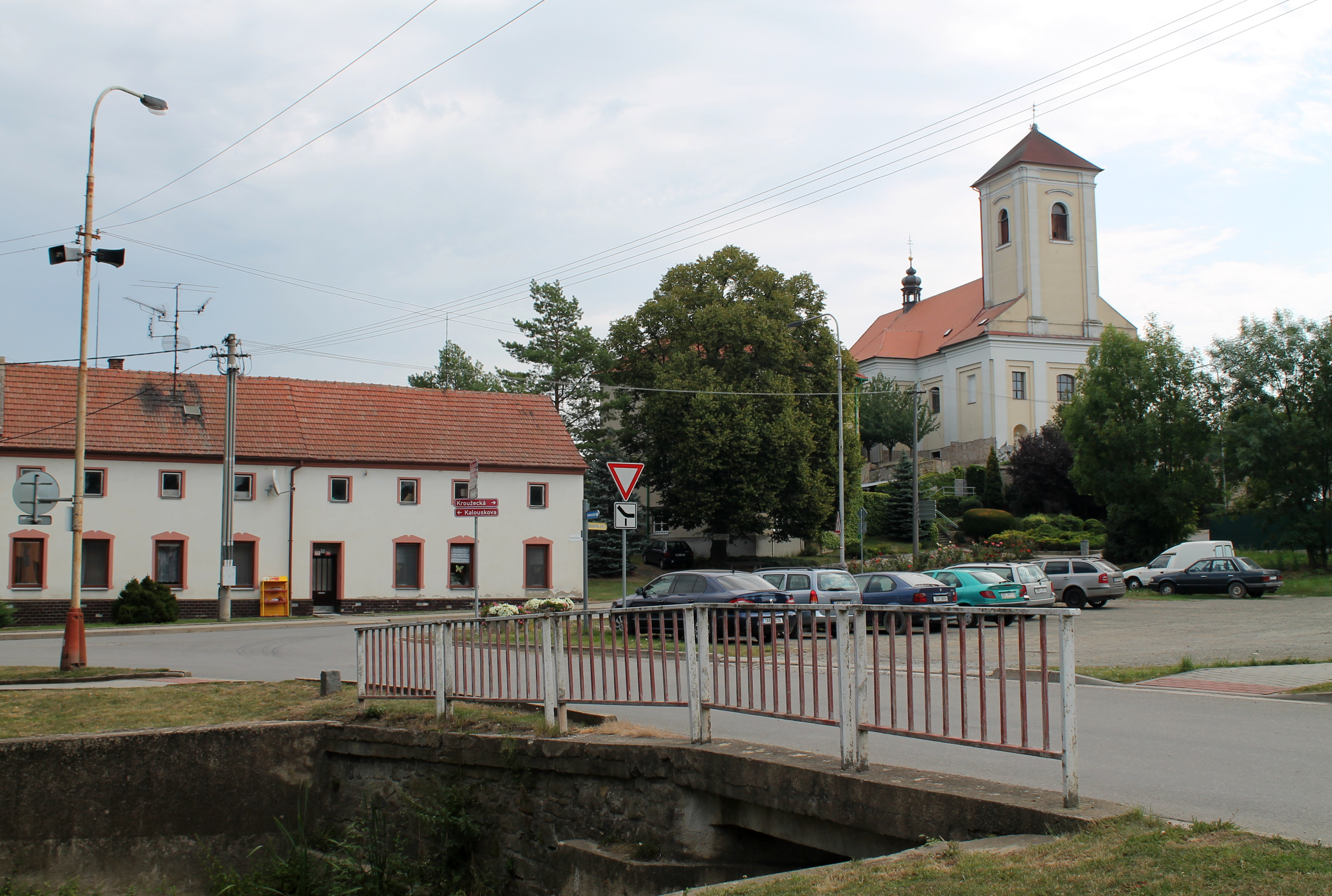
Centre of Rousínovec

The main landmark of Rousínov is the Church of Saint Mary Magdalene. It was built in the Baroque style at the turn of the 17th and 18th centuries, according to the design by Domenico Martinelli.

In addition to the church, a notable landmark of the town square is the Old Town Hall building. It is a valuable Baroque building from the first half of the 18th century.

The former synagogue was built in the Neoclassical style in 1842 on the site of an older synagogue. Today the building is used as the prayer house of the Czechoslovak Hussite Church.

The Church of Saint Wenceslaus is located in Rousínovec. It was built in the Baroque style in 1718–1734 and also was designed by D. Martinelli.

The Church of Saints Philip and James is located in Královopolské Vážany. It was built in the late Baroque style in 1763–1768. Next to the church is a separate Neoclassical bell tower, dating from 1828.

== Notable people ==
- Menahem Mendel Auerbach (1620–1689), Austrian rabbi, banker and commentator; lived here
- Josef Flesch (1781–1839), writer and translator
- Nikolai Brashman (1796–1866), Russian mathematician
- František Sušil (1804–1868), priest and folk music collector
- Jacob Brüll (1812–1889), talmudic scholar and rabbi
- Nehemiah Brüll (1843–1892), rabbi

== Twin towns – sister cities ==
Rousínov is twinned with:

- Dervio, Italy
- Halásztelek, Hungary
- Podbranč, Slovakia
