= Ir nidachat =

The Ir nidachat (Hebrew: עיר נידחת; the "city led astray") is a biblical command on idolatry in Deuteronomy 13:13-19. If the inhabitants of an Israelite city become idolaters, they and their livestock must be slaughtered and the city be burnt to the ground, never to be rebuilt. See discussion under Re'eh, the weekly Torah portion including this section.

Note that the Sages (Sanhedrin 71a; Rabbi Jonathan dissenting) interpreted this law so restrictively that “there never was and never will be” a case in which the law was applied; here, if the city contains even a single mezuzah, the law is not enforced. Under this view, this law — along with ben sorer umoreh ("the wayward son") — was never meant to be put into practice, but was written solely “so that we should expound and receive reward.” It has only an educational and not a legal function.
