= František Sušil =

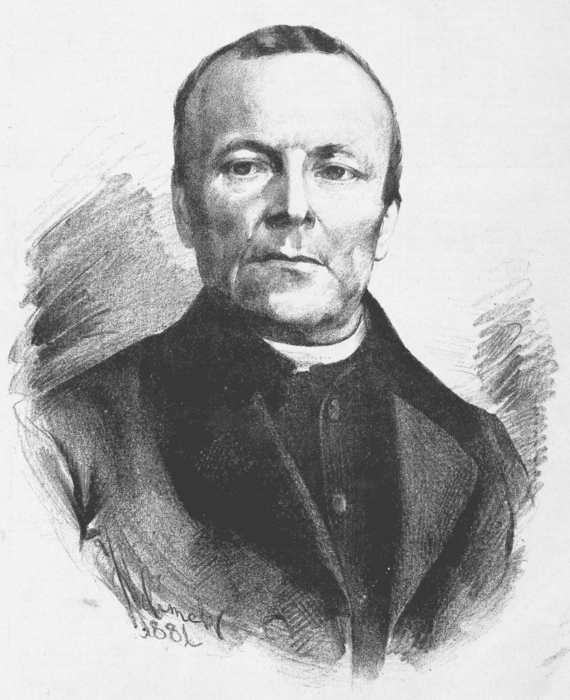
Portrait of Sušil by Jan Vilímek

František Sušil (14 June 1804 in Rousínov – 31 May 1868 in Bystřice pod Hostýnem) was a Czech Roman Catholic priest. He is most noted for his published collection of traditional Moravian folk music, Moravské národní písně, which contained 2091 songs and 2361 texts. Composers who have used Sušil's melodies include Antonín Dvořák, Leoš Janáček, Vítězslav Novák and Bohuslav Martinů.
