= Rabbi Josiah =

Rabbi Josiah (Hebrew: רבי יאשיה) was a Tanna of the 2nd century, the most distinguished pupil of R. Ishmael.

He is not mentioned in the Mishnah, perhaps because he lived in the south, and his teachings were consequently unknown to the compiler of the Mishnah, Judah ha-Nasi, who lived at Tiberias and Beit She'arim in northern Israel. This is the explanation proposed by Z. Frankel and N. Brüll; but the fact may have been that the Mishnah of Rabbi Meir, which served as the basis of Rebbi's Mishnah, did not accept the development of the teachings of Ishmael as formulated by Josiah and R. Jonathan, and they were consequently omitted by Rebbi from his Mishnah.

Josiah and Rabbi Jonathan were educated together at the academy of Ishmael ben Elisha, and the two are frequently mentioned together in the Mekhilta. All their differences concerned only interpretations of Biblical passages, never halakot.

During Hadrian's persecution, Josiah seems to have fled from Israel, for he was at Nisibis, where he delivered precepts in the college of Judah ben Bathyra.
