= Nehemiah Brüll =

Czech-German rabbi (1843–1891)

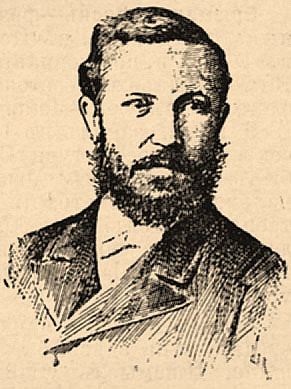
Nehemiah Brüll

Nehemiah Brüll (16 March 1843 in Rousínov, Moravia – 5 February 1891 in Frankfurt am Main) was a rabbi and versatile scholar.

== Life ==
Brüll received his rabbinic-Talmudic education from his father, Jakob Brüll (de), who combined wide Talmudic knowledge with acute historical perception. He then studied classical and Oriental languages and history at the University of Vienna, having at the same time a good opportunity to continue his Talmudic studies at the Vienna bet ha-Midrash, then under the direction of men like I. H. Weiss, M. Friedmann, and Adolf Jellinek. Here, too, Brüll, the son of a conservative rabbi, and the grandson of the arch-Orthodox chief rabbi of Moravia, Nahum Trebitsch, developed into a decided Reformer and a disciple of Abraham Geiger.

Brüll was called as rabbi to Bzenec, one of the Reform communities of Moravia, an office that be resigned in 1870 in order to take charge of the rabbinate of Frankfurt am Main. He owed this appointment to Geiger, who drew the attention of his native community to the young Moravian rabbi. Brüll remained with this ancient community until his death, although his position was fraught with disappointment.

As a result of the movement inaugurated by Samson Raphael Hirsch at Frankfurt, even the circles that were not Orthodox tended gradually toward the conservative party. Brüll cared as little for compromise as did his opponent Hirsch. An enthusiastic representative of the Reform movement, for religious as well as scientific reasons, he was decidedly opposed to any attempts at reconciliation between Reform and Orthodoxy.

Yet he was not the man to influence the masses: his sermons, less effective from the pulpit, had to be read in order to be appreciated. Not until he saw that all his efforts were in vain, and he had been personally attacked, did he retire to devote himself to his studies, greatly to the honor and advantage of Jewish learning.

== Brüll's scholarly importance ==
Brüll's researches ranged over almost all the branches of Jewish science, including Bible exegesis and grammar, Jewish history and literature, the Apocrypha, Biblical Halakah, casuistics, responsa, general history, philology, poetry, Jewish-German literature; and he contributed to all these by original investigation. Adolf Jellinek says of Brüll: His range of reading in Jewish literature was hardly paralleled, and he evinced a peculiar acumen found in no other scholar of modern times (in Adolf Brüll's Monatsblätter, xi. 50).

== Books ==
Brüll collected the results of his scholarship in the ten volumes of his Jahrbücher (Frankfort-on-the-Main, 1874–90). He contributed almost the entire material to these Jahrbücher—the longer and shorter essays as well as the numerous criticisms on new books. Many of these essays have also been printed separately.

=== Bible ===
- Beiträge zur Erklärung des Buches Hosea (Jahrb. v.-vi. 1-62)
- Historische Basis des Buches Ruth (v.-vi. 63-70)
- Das Apokryphische Susannabuch (iii. 1-69)
- Die Epistolischen Apokryphen und die Apokryphischen Zusätze zum Buche Daniel.

=== Talmud ===
- Die Talmudischen Tractate über Trauer um Verstorbene (i. 1-57)
- Fremdsprachliche Wörter in den Talmuden und Midraschim (i. 123-210)
- Die Entstehungsgeschichte des Babylonischen Talmuds als Schriftwerkes (ii. 1-123)
- Verschollene Baraitas und Midraschim (ii. 124-133)
- Entstehung und Ursprünglicher Inhalt des Tractates Abot (vii. 1-17)
- Eingeschaltete Partien im Babylonischen Talmud (viii. 59-60).

=== History ===
- Adiabene (i. 58-86)
- Das Geschlecht der Treves (i. 87-122)
- Die Polemik für und gegen Maimuni im Dreizehnten Jahrhundert (iv. 1-33)
- Zur Gesch. der Jüdisch-Ethischen Literatur des Mittelalters (v.-vi. 71-93)
- Sprüchwörter in der Nachtalmudischen Literatur des Judenthums (vii. 18-30).

== Bibliographical works ==
Brüll's range of reading and critical insight constituted him an important reviewer of new books in the field of Jewish science.

His Jahrbücher contain 183 reviews, all of which illuminate more or less the subjects with which they deal. In 1890 Brüll undertook a continuation of the Hebräische Bibliographie, edited by Moritz Steinschneider, under the title Central-Anzeiger für Jüdische Literatur; but only one volume appeared (Frankfurt am Main, 1891), as the undertaking was cut short by Brüll's death. At the instance of Steinschneider, the Zunz-Stiftung had commissioned Brüll to add a supplement to Leopold Zunz's Gottesdienstliche Vorträge, the basic work of modern Jewish science. Steinschneider remarked in his preface to the second edition of the work in question (xvi.): "Dr. Brüll appeared to me to possess the rare combination of ability and leisure, zeal and perseverance, requisite for editing such a supplement.'"

Brüll had intended to devote his whole scholarship to this undertaking. The scattered notes that were found in his papers after his death were in part incorporated in the second edition of the Gottesdienstliche Vorträge (ib. 1892).

Brüll was among the few German scholars who also wrote in Hebrew, as may be seen by his many contributions to the Hebrew periodicals Bet-Talmud, Bet ha-Midrash, Ha-Karmel, and Oẓar ha-Sifrut. Of these, Toledot Shabbethai Ẓebi (Wilna, 1879) and Ner la-Maor, a biography of Aaron Worms, in Ozar ha-Sifrut, ii. 20-31, deserve special mention.

Brüll also printed his sermons (1869) and addresses (1878). Grabreden (Frankfort-on-the-Main, 1895) and Trauungsreden (ib. 1891) were published posthumously.
