= Rabbi Jonathan =

Rabbi Jonathan (Hebrew: רבי יונתן, romanized: Rabi Yonatan) was a tanna of the 2nd century and schoolfellow of R. Josiah, apart from whom he is rarely quoted.

Jonathan is generally so cited within further designation; but there is ample reason for identifying him with the less frequently occurring Jonathan (or Nathan) b. Joseph (or "Jose").

== Biography ==
In consequence of the Hadrianic religious persecutions he determined to emigrate from Israel, and with several other scholars started on a journey to foreign parts. But his patriotism and innate love for the Holy Land would not permit him to remain abroad.

Jonathan and Josiah were educated together at the academy of Ishmael ben Elisha, whose dialectic system, as opposed to that of Rabbi Akiva, they acquired. It is even reported that Jonathan all but converted Ben Azzai, a "fellow student" of Akiva, to Ishmael's system, and made him deeply regret his failure to study it more closely. Ben 'Azzai then exclaimed, "Woe is me that I have not waited on Ishmael". Nevertheless, in later years, probably after Ishmael's death, both Jonathan and Josiah adopted some of Akiva's principles. Of Jonathan it is expressly stated that "he followed the system of his teacher Akiva".

== Teachings ==
Together, Jonathan and Josiah devoted their analytical minds to midrash halachah, interpreting laws as they understood them from the corresponding Scriptural texts, but not suggesting them. Only one halakhah unconnected with a Scriptural text bears their names. Their argumentations are mostly embodied in the Mekhilta (about thirty) and in the Sifre to Numbers (over forty). Neither Jonathan nor Josiah appears in Rebbi's compilation of the Mishnah, with the exception of a single teaching, in the name of Jonathan Of other ancient compilations, the Tosefta cites these scholars once, while the Sifra mentions them twice by their names; once "Jonathan ben Joseph" occurs; and some of R. Josiah's midrashim are cited, but anonymously.

Contrary to the astrological views of his times, Jonathan taught the Scriptural idea of natural phenomena; quoting Jeremiah 10:2, he added: "Eclipses may frighten Gentiles, but they have no significance for Jews". To the question as to the permissibility of profaning the Sabbath to save human life he answered, "The Law says 'The children of Israel shall keep the Sabbath, to observe the Sabbath throughout their generations'; but one may profane one Sabbath in order to preserve a man that he may observe many Sabbaths". According to him, an am ha'aretz is one who has children and does not train them in the knowledge of the Law. Jonathan contradicted the general opinion of earlier and contemporaneous rabbis that a ben sorer umoreh ("rebellious son"; Deuteronomy 21:18-21) never was and never will be executed, and that the ir nidachat never did and never will occur; he declared that he himself had sat on the grave of an executed rebellious son and had seen a ruined ir nidachat.

=== Quotes ===
Jonathan was the author of many aphorisms, among them:

- He that observes the Torah in poverty shall in the end observe it in wealth; and he that neglects the Torah in wealth shall in the end neglect it in poverty.
- The angry man is controlled by many and variegated manifestations of hell.
- Consoling the mourner, visiting the sick, and practical beneficence bring heavenly grace into the world.
