= Shlomo Yosef Englard =

Radziner Rebbe

Rabbi Shlomo Yosef Englard שלמה יוסף אנגלרד
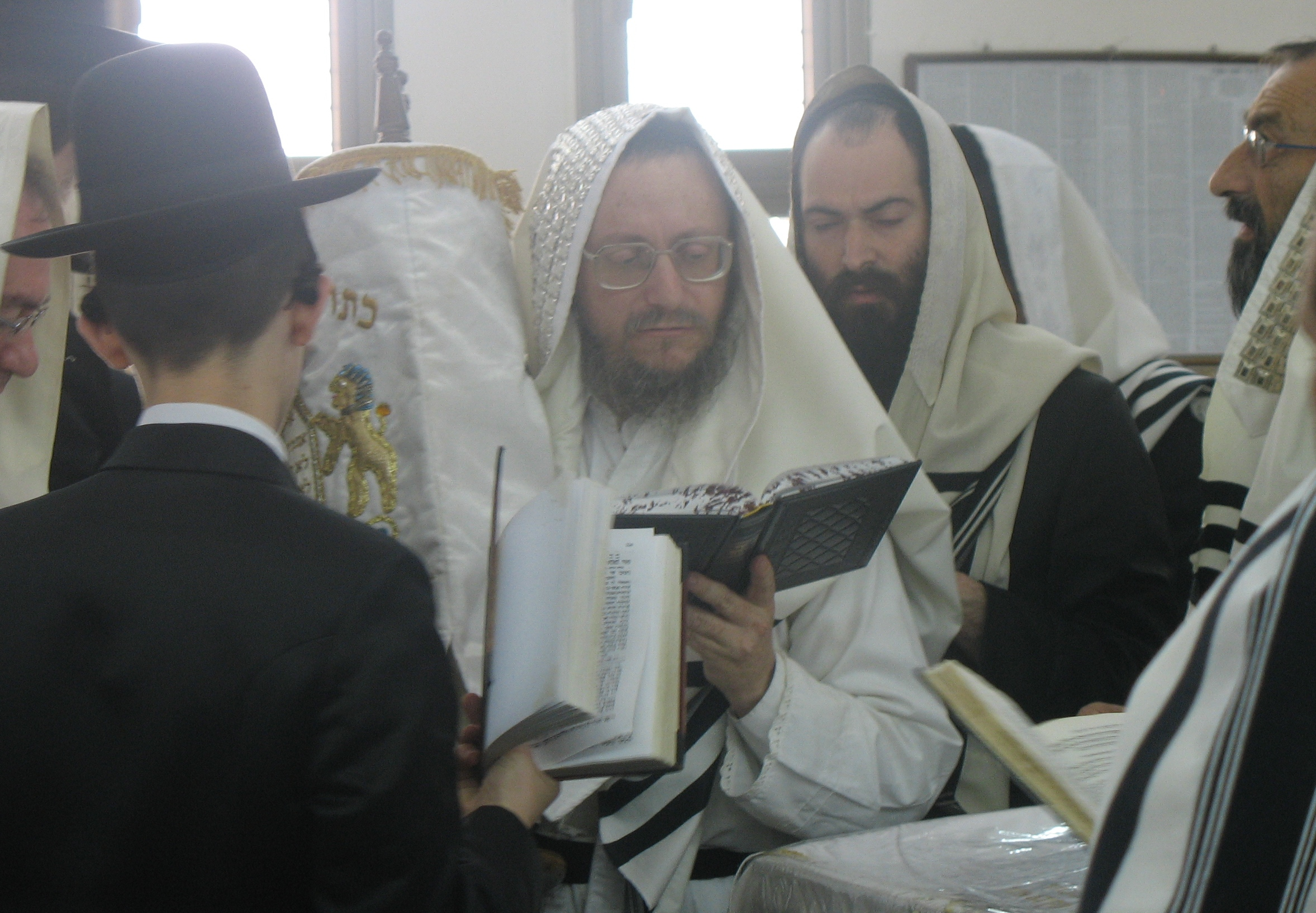
- Title: Radziner Rebbe

Personal life
- Born: Brooklyn, New York
- Parents: Rabbi Avrohom Yissochor Englard (father); Rebbetzin Sara Bluma Englard (mother)
- Dynasty: Radzin

Religious life
- Religion: Judaism

Jewish leader
- Predecessor: Rabbi Avrohom Yissochor Englard
- Dynasty: Radzin

Grand Rabbi Shlomo Yosef Englard (Hebrew: שלמה יוסף אנגלרד) is the current Radziner Rebbe. He is considered an authority on Tekhelet and Rabbinic genealogy.

== Biography ==
Englard was born in Brooklyn New York. At the time of his birth, his father Rabbi Avrohom Yissochor Englard led a congregation in Crown Heights, Brooklyn. He had previously been the Rabbi of Sosnowiec, Poland and would later become Radziner Rebbe.

== Radziner Rebbe ==
Following the death of his father on died on 20 Tishrei 5766 (2005), Englard became Radziner Rebbe. Englard writes a weekly publication on the parsha titled Tiferes Radzyn.

== Authority on Tekhelet ==
Englard is considered an authority on Tekhelet. He frequently lectures on the topic and was a featured speaker at the 2016 annual Agudath Israel of America Yarchei Kallah in Jerusalem Israel.

== Authority on Rabbinical Genealogy ==
Englard is considered to be an authority on rabbinical genealogy. He has published his research in a number of articles in the journal Tsfunot. Several genealogists have quoted Englard’s work in articles published in Avotaynu.

== Lineage of the Izhbitza-Radzin dynasty ==
Rabbi Mordechai Yosef Leiner (1801–1854); 1st Rebbe of Izhbitza-Radzin
Rabbi Yaakov Leiner (1828–1878); 2nd Rebbe of Izhbitza-Radzin
Rabbi Gershon Chanoch Henech Leiner (1839–1890); 3rd Rebbe of Izhbitza-Radzin
Rabbi Mordechai Yosef Elazar Leiner (1873–1929); 4th Rebbe of Izhbitza-Radzin
Rabbi Shmuel Shlomo Leiner (1909-1942); 5th Rebbe of Izhbitza-Radzin	Rabbi Avrohom Yissochor Englard (1905-2005); 6th Rebbe of Izhbitza-Radzin
Rabbi Shlomo Yosef Englard; 7th Rebbe of Izhbitza-Radzin	Rabbi Nosson Nochum Englard; Rebbe of Radzin-Yerushalayim
