= Avrohom Yissochor Englard =

Rabbi

Rabbi Avraham Yissochor Englard אברהם יששכור אנגלרד
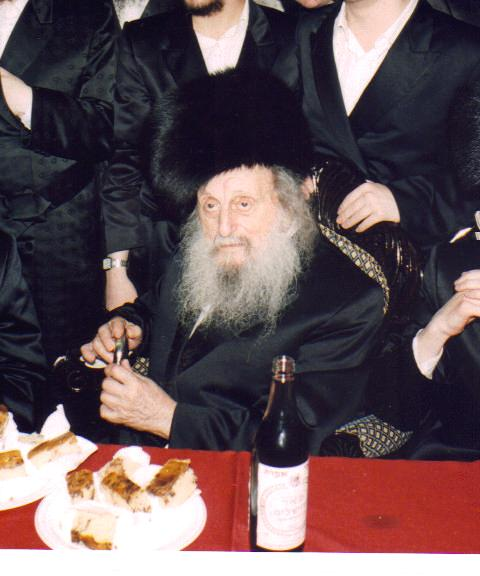
- Title: Radziner Rebbe

Personal life
- Born: Kromołów, Silesian Voivodeship, Poland
- Died: 2005 Israel
- Buried: Har HaMenuchot Jerusalem, Israel
- Parents: Rabbi Yeshayahu Englard (father); Rebbetzin Esther Frimet Rabinowicz (mother)
- Dynasty: Radzin

Religious life
- Religion: Judaism

Jewish leader
- Predecessor: Rabbi Shmuel Shlomo Leiner
- Successor: Rabbi Shlomo Yosef Englard (Radziner Rebbe); Rabbi Nosson Nochum Englard (Radzin-Yerushalayim Rebbe)
- Yahrtzeit: 20 Tishrei
- Dynasty: Radzin

Grand Rabbi Avraham Yissochor Englard of Radzin (Hebrew: אברהם יששכור אנגלרד) was a scion of Radomsk and the Chief Rabbi of Sosnowiec.

== Chief Rabbi of Sosnowiec ==
After surviving the Holocaust, Englard returned to Sosnowiec Poland where he served as Chief Rabbi for several years.

== Scion of Radomsk ==
Englard's mother Esther Frimet was a daughter of Rabbi Nosson Nachum Rabinowicz (the Krimilover Rebbe), who a son of the 2nd Radomsker Rebbe - Avraham Yissachar Dov Rabinowicz and a grandson of the 1st Radomsker Rebbe - Shlomo Rabinowicz.

After emigrating to the United States, he was instrumental in founding the Radomsker Kehilla in Boro Park and would conduct a tish there on many occasions.

== Radziner Rebbe ==
Englard (by his first marriage) was the son-in-law of Tiferes Yosef and brother-in-law of Grand Rabbi Shmuel Shlomo Leiner of Radzin. After the Holocaust he was crowned as successor of the Izhbitza-Radziner Dynasty in Eretz Yisroel by most of the descendants of the Izhbitza-Radzin family, and by Radziner Hasidim in Eretz Yisroel and worldwide. [Radziner Chasidim did so in accordance with the final parting words of the previous rebbe, Grand Rabbi Shmuel Shlomo Leiner of Radzin, before he was killed al Kiddush Hashem]. Under his leadership, the Izhbitzer-Radziner Dynasty rebuilt itself, with the Center of Radziner Institutions being established in Bnei Brak. The Rebbe also established Radziner Shuls (known as Shtieblech) in many cities where Radziner Hassidim were concentrated. This includes Jerusalem, Haifa, Netanya, Tel Aviv, Holon and Petah Tikva. The Rebbe also established the Radziner Yeshiva Sod Y'sharim in Jerusalem, the Radziner Yeshiva Ateres Shlomo in Bnei Brak, the Radziner Yeshiva Tiferes Yosef in Bnei Brak, with many Kollelim located in Jerusalem, Bnei Brak, and Haifa.

== Death ==
Englard died on 20 Tishrei 5766 (2005) and is buried in the Rabbinical section (Chelkas HoRabbanim) of Har HaMenuchos, Jerusalem.

== Family ==
• Englard's eldest son, Rabbi Yeshayahu Englard was one of the Rabbonim of the Radomsker Shul in Brooklyn, he died during the COVID-19 pandemic.

• Englard's middle son, Rabbi Yitzchok Englard is the one who is responsible for making Radziner Techeiles.

• Englard's youngest son, Rabbi Shlomo Englard is the current Radziner Rebbe.

• Englard's eldest grandson Rabbi Nosson Nochum Englard (a son of Rabbi Yeshayahu) is the Radzin-Yerushalayim Rebbe.
