= Israel Joshua Trunk =

Polish posek (1821-1893)

Rabbi Israel Elijah Joshua Trunk of Kutno (1821-1893) was an important Polish posek of the late 19th century. He is sometimes referred to by the title of his collection of responsa, the Yeshuot Malko.

== Biography ==
He was born in 1821, and named after three great rabbis: the Baal Shem Tov, Vilna Gaon, and Pnei Yehoshua. Nevertheless, he would sign his name "Israel Joshua", because the letters of "Elijah" also appear in the other two names (ישראל יהושע).

He was initially taught by his father, but orphaned at age 11. At age 14 he married Friva, the orphan daughter of R' Haim ben Rabbi Yehudah of Rawicz. For the next six years, he learned Torah while supported by his mother-in-law. He received semicha from R' Shraga Feivel Danzinger. Starting in 1840, he served as the rabbi of Szreńsk, Gąbin, Warka, and Pułtusk in succession. In 1861 he became the rabbi of Kutno, where he served until his death.

== Teachings and attitudes ==
He was known for his love for the Land of Israel. He praised the book Derishat Tzion by R' Zvi Hirsch Kalischer upon its publication, and in 1886 visited the Land of Israel with the goal of encouraging the Old Yishuv to begin agricultural settlement. In the shmita controversy of 1889, he was one of the first rabbis to formally approve the heter mechira.

He opposed the Radzyner rebbe's suggestion that cuttlefish are the source of techelet for tzitzit.

He authored a number of works:

- Responsa Yeshuot Malko
- Yeshuot Yisrael, on Hoshen Mishpat
- Yavin Daat - Hasdei Avot, on Yoreh Deah
- Ginzei Avot - a collection of responsa and other manuscripts, published 2006

== Bibliography ==
- R' Yisrael Yehoshua Tronk meKotna (part 1)
- R' Yisrael Yehoshua Tronk meKotna (part 2)
- רבי ישראל יהושע טרונק מקוטנא: 110 שנים לפטירתו
- Israel Joshua Trunk
