= Izhbitza-Radzin =

Polish Hasidic dynasty

Izhbitza-Radzin Hasidic Dynasty
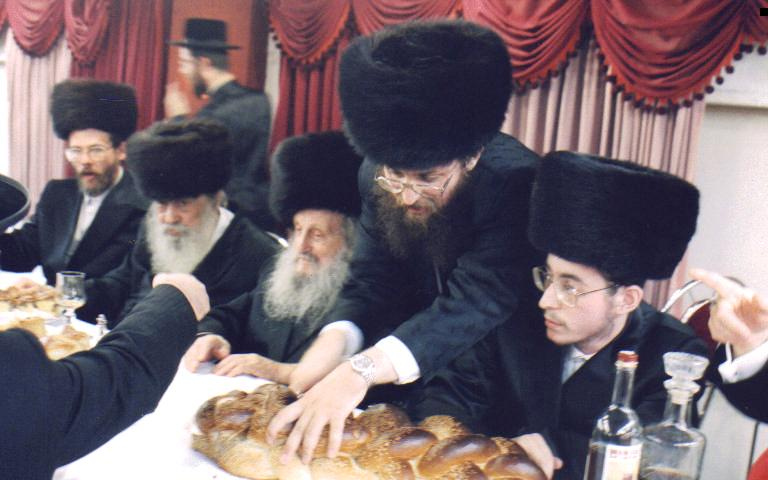
- Grand Rabbi Avraham Yissachor Englard of Radzin (second from right) with his eldest grandson Rabbi Nosson Nachum Englard of Radzin-Yerushalayim (first from right). Also seen are the rabbis of Strikov and Sochotshov.

Founder
- Mordechai Yosef Leiner

Regions with significant populations
- Israel, United States, Poland

Religions
- Hasidic Judaism

Languages
- Hebrew, Yiddish
- Current headquarters in Bnei Brak, Israel

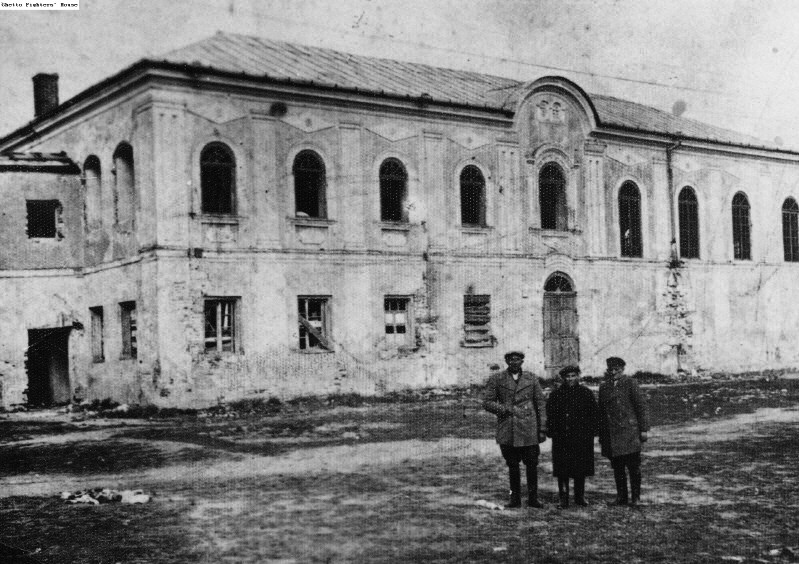
Shul in Izhbitza

The Central Radziner Beis Hamedrash in Bnei Brak, which houses the Radziner Yeshiva Ateres Shlomo and the Yeshiva Tiferes Yosef

Izhbitza-Radzin is a dynasty of Hasidic rebbes. The first rebbe was Rabbi Mordechai Yosef Leiner from Izbica (in present-day Poland), author of Mei Hashiloach who left the court of Rabbi Menachem Mendel of Kotzk to found his own Hasidic movement in 1839.

His son and successor, Rabbi Yaakov Leiner of Izhbitza, moved to Radzin. The dynasty today is therefore known more as the Radziner dynasty. The third Rebbe, Rabbi Gershon Henoch Leiner of Radzin, re-instituted the use of a version of techeiles of the tzitzis.

The better known works of the Izhbitzer-Radziner Rebbes are Mei Hashiloach, Beis Yaakov, Sod Yesharim, and Tiferes Yosef. Today, the largest center of Radziner Hasidim is found in Bnei Brak, Israel, under the leadership of Rabbi Shlomo Yosef Englard of Radzin.

== History ==
=== Lineage of the Izhbitza-Radzin dynasty ===
Rabbi Mordechai Yosef Leiner (1801–1854); 1st Rebbe of Izhbitza-Radzin
Rabbi Yaakov Leiner (1828–1878); 2nd Rebbe of Izhbitza-Radzin
Rabbi Gershon Chanoch Henech Leiner (1839–1890); 3rd Rebbe of Izhbitza-Radzin
Rabbi Mordechai Yosef Elazar Leiner (1873–1929); 4th Rebbe of Izhbitza-Radzin
Rabbi Shmuel Shlomo Leiner (1909-1942); 5th Rebbe of Izhbitza-Radzin	Rabbi Avrohom Yissochor Englard (1905-2005); 6th Rebbe of Izhbitza-Radzin
Rabbi Shlomo Yosef Englard; 7th Rebbe of Izhbitza-Radzin	Rabbi Nosson Nochum Englard; Rebbe of Radzin-Yerushalayim

=== First generation ===
The Izhbitzer-Radziner dynasty was established on Succos 5600 (1839) by Rabbi Mordechai Yosef Leiner, author of the Mei Hashiloach. He was a close disciple of Rabbi Simcha Bunim of Peshischa. After Simcha Bunim's death, Mordechai Yosef joined the court of his long-time childhood friend, Rabbi Menachem Mendel of Kotzk, who appointed him to guide the young chassidim who joined Kotzk. When the Kotzker Rebbe began distancing himself from his chassidim, Mordechai Yosef felt it was time for him to begin leading those who were in need of a Rebbe. He left Kotzk, settling in Izhbitza, being known hence as the Izhbitzer Rebbe. He died 7 Teves 5614 (1854), and was buried in Izhbitza. A number of years after his death a small part of his ideas were put to writing by his grandson, Rabbi Gershon Henoch Leiner of Radzin.

=== Second generation ===
After the death of the Mei Hashiloach, most of his followers appointed his eldest son, Rabbi Yaakov Leiner, author of Beis Yaakov and Sefer Hazemanim, as Izhbitzer Rebbe (although some went with Rabbi Yehuda Leib Eiger and Rabbi Zadok HaKohen Rabbinowitz, disciples of the late Rebbe, to create the Lublin Hasidim). He expanded vastly the Torah of his father, and constantly spoke Torah to his chassidim. During his days the numbers of Izhbitzer Chassidim grew vastly, as he was much more accommodating for newcomers. Many of his thoughts were later published in Beis Yaakov, by his son and successor, Rabbi Gershon Henoch Leiner of Radzin. The Beis Yaakov died 15 Av 5638 (1878) in Druzgenik, Lithuania, and was buried in the nearby village of Rotnica, Lithuania.

=== Third generation ===
After the death of the Beis Yaakov, his followers appointed his eldest son, Rabbi Gershon Henoch Leiner, author of Orchos Chayim (on the Tzava'ah - the will - of the Tana Rabbi Eliezer HaGadol) as his successor. He was the first rebbe in the dynasty known as the Radziner Rebbe. Rav Gershon Henoch was a student of his grandfather and father. The Rebbe is referred to by Radziner Chasidim as the Orchos Chayim, based on his above-mentioned work. (When the Rebbe published this work, he commented to his brother that he's happy that he got to print his Tzava'ah.) In the larger world, the Rebbe is better known as the Ba'al HaTecheiles. He led his followers with a more extreme leadership, similar to that of his grandfather, differing from his father's style. The Orchos Chaim died 4 Teves 5651 (1890), and was buried in Radzin.

=== Fourth generation ===
After the death of the Orchos Chaim, his followers appointed his only son, Rabbi Mordechai Yosef Elazar Leiner, the Tiferes Yosef, as Radziner Rebbe. The Tiferes Yosef led his followers with a very calm leadership. Thus in his days Radziner Chassidim numbered in the thousands. He was very instrumental in the establishment of Agudat Yisrael, and served as its vice president until his death. During World War I he moved to Warsaw, leading his followers from there. The Rebbe re-instituted the famous shiurim on the Talmud, based on chassidic approaches, which were popular during the times of the Mei HaShiloach. Many of these shiurim were later printed in his sefer, Tiferes Yosef. The Tiferes Yosef died on 26 Shevat 5689 (1929), and was buried in Warsaw.

=== Fifth generation ===
After the death of the Tiferes Yosef, his followers appointed his only son, Rabbi Shmuel Shlomo Leiner, as Radzyner Rebbe. At first, the Rebbe refused to take over his father's position. Only due to the enormous pressure put on him by the thousands of Radziner Chassidim, did he finally consent. The final push was the pressure put on him by his great-uncle, Rav Mottel Leiner, son of the Beis Yaakov, and Rav Michel Rashes of Brisk, one of the most prominent Radziner Chassidim. The Rebbe led his followers with a very sharp and extreme leadership, similar to that of his grandfather, the Orchos Chaim. This caused many chassidim to have to leave Radzin. The Rebbe went as far as to close various shteiblach, which he believed were not appropriate of being called Radziner Shtieblech. His greatest strength of character was brought to light during the years of The Holocaust. The Rebbe was known for encouraging resistance to the orders of the Nazis and the Judenrat, and for urging people to break out of the ghettos, flee to the forests and take up arms. The Nazis searched for him intensively, and he was eventually shot to death on 29 Iyar 5702 (1942). He was buried in Wladawa.

=== Radzin post-Holocaust ===
After the Holocaust, the surviving Izhbitzer-Radziner Chassidim crowned Rabbi Avrohom Yissochor Englard (1905–2005), son-in-law of the Tiferes Yosef, as Radziner Rebbe. The Rebbe was also the great-grandson of the second Radomsker Rebbe, Rabbi Avraham Yissachar Dov Rabinowicz, author of the Chessed Le'avrohom. In pre-war Radzin, he was appointed by his brother-in-law, Rabbi Shmuel Shlomo of Radzin, to head the network of Radziner Yeshivos Sod Yesharim. According to the elder chassidim, Rav Shmuel Shlomo crowned him during the Holocaust, before his death, to lead in his place.

Under his leadership, the Izhbitzer-Radziner Dynasty rebuilt itself, with the Center of Radziner Institutions being established in Bnei Brak. The Rebbe also established Radziner Shtieblech in many cities where Radziner Hassidim were concentrated. This includes Jerusalem, Haifa, Netanya, Tel Aviv, Bnei Brak, Holon and Petah Tikva. The Rebbe also re-established the Radziner Yeshiva Sod Yesharim in Jerusalem. In Bnei Brak he established the Radziner Yeshiva Ateres Shlomo, and the Radziner Yeshiva Tiferes Yosef, with many Kollelim located in Jerusalem, Bnei Brak, and Haifa.

An important achievement of Avrohom Yissachar was the re-institution of the dyeing of the techeiles. Much effort was put in by him to re-establish the exact procedure as was done in prewar Radzin. Due to his countless efforts, the establishment of the Center for the Dyeing of the Techeiles was completed in Bnei Brak. The Rebbe appointed his son, Rabbi Yitzchok Englard, to head this institution.

Avraham Yissachar led his followers with a calm and loving leadership, similar to that of his father-in-law, the Tiferes Yosef. He died 20 Tishrei 5766 (2005), and was buried in the Rabbinical section (Chelkas HoRabbanim) of Har HaMenuchos, Jerusalem.

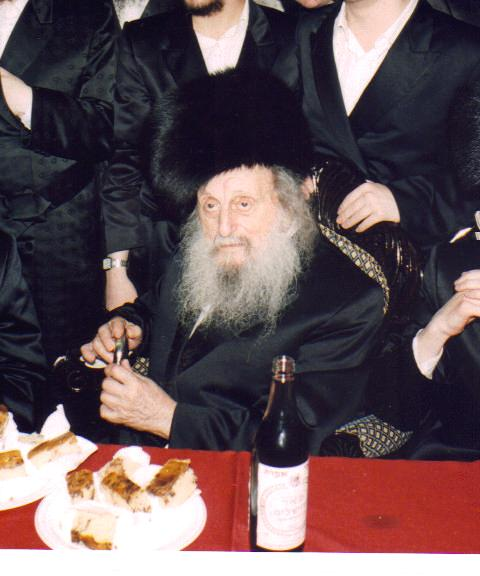
Grand Rabbi Avrohom Yissochor Englard of Radzin

=== Radzin today ===
After the death of Rabbi Avrohom Yissochor of Radzin, his followers crowned his son, Rabbi Shlomo Yosef Englard, as Radziner Rebbe. He currently resides in Bnei Brak, leading the Radziner Chassidim from the Central Radziner Institution. The Radziner Shtieblech continue to thrive in various cities. In Yerushalayim, the eldest grandson of Rav Avrohom Yissochor, Rabbi Nosson Nochum Englard, was appointed as Radziner Rav, leading the Radziner Shtiebel and community there.

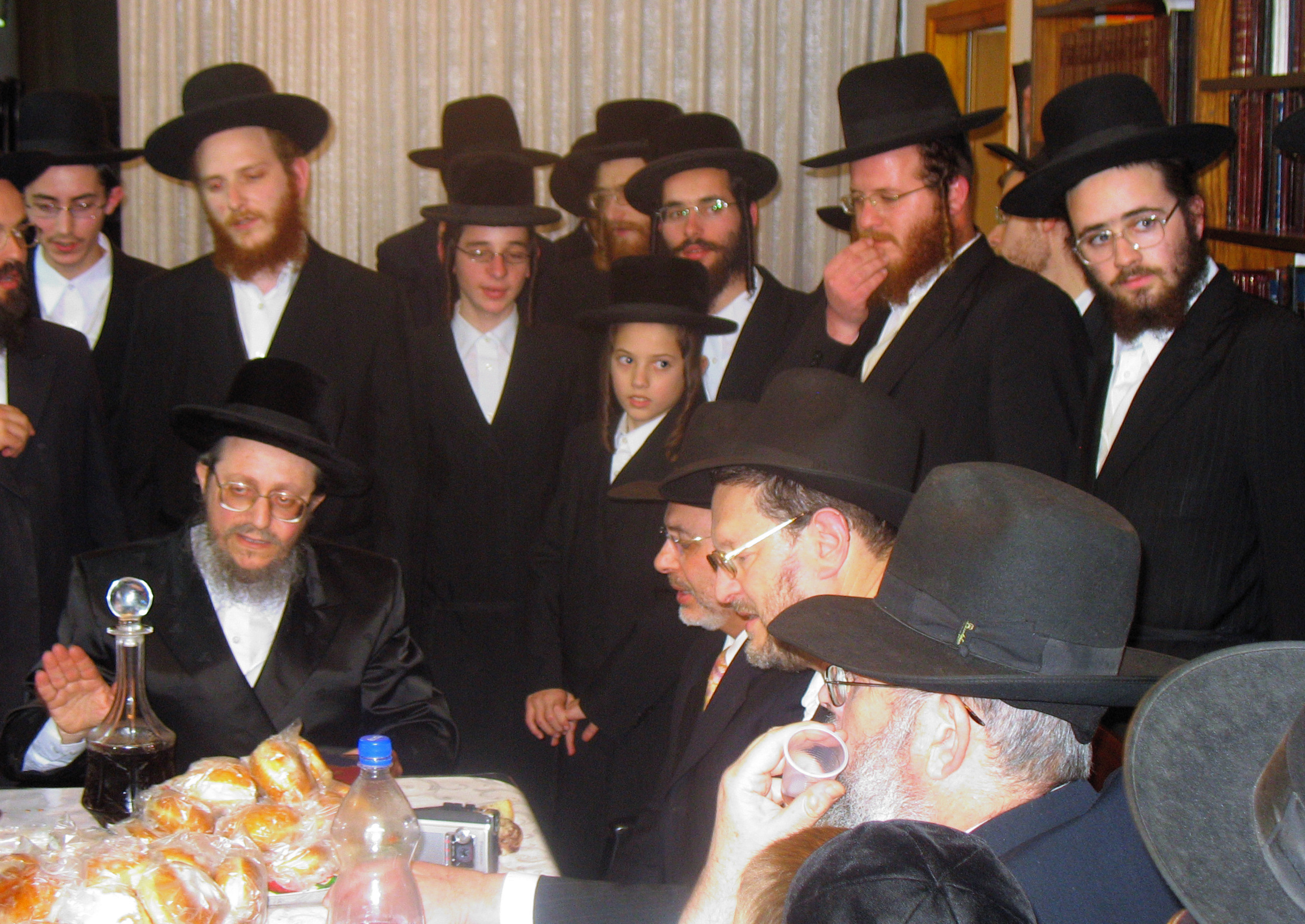
Grand Rabbi Shlomo Yosef Englard of Radzin - Chanukkah Tisch 5769 (2008)

== Additional branch of Radzin ==
In the third generation, after the death of the Orchos Chaim, his younger brother, Rabbi Avraham Yehoshua Heshel Leiner, became Rebbe in the city of Chelm. He was one of the top students of his older brother, the Orchos Chaim. After his death on 27 Shevat 5680 (1920), two of his sons became Rebbe in Chelm, Rabbi Gedalya and Rabbi Ovadya. A number of years later, his son, Rabbi Yeruchem Leiner, became Radziner Rebbe in Cricklewood, England. After the holocaust, he relocated to the Boro Park neighborhood of Brooklyn, opening a Radziner Shtiebel there. His ideas were later published in Tiferes Yeruchem.

After his death on 20 Av 5724 (1964), his son, Rabbi Mordechai Yosef Leiner, took his place, until his death on 3 Shevat 5751 (1991).

After Rabbi Mordechai Yosef's death, his eldest son, Rabbi Yaakov Leiner, became Radziner Rebbe, until his sudden death on 5 Iyar 5769 (2009). Rav Yaakov studied at Yeshiva Rabbi Chaim Berlin, and then at Rabbi Nosson Dovid Rabinowitz's kollel in Shaarei Chesed. He received semichos from the Chief Rabbi of Jerusalem, Rabbi Yitzchok Kolitz and Rabbi Zalman Nechemia Goldberg. In the summer of 1996, he left the kollel to learn for six years in Beth Medrash Govoah in Lakewood, New Jersey, once again reuniting with a Radziner, the rosh yeshiva, Rabbi Yerucham Olshin. During those six years he reviewed his Yoreh Deah many times and went through many Talmudic tractates. In 1992, at the age of 30, he married Miriam, of the Bookson family of Monsey, New York. They had eleven children. Rabbi Yaakov published all the writings of his grandfather, Rabbi Yeruchem, a few months before the former's death and considered that work to be his crowning achievement. After Rabbi Yaakov's death, his ideas were published in Tiferes Yaakov.

Rabbi Moshe Leiner, second son of Rabbi Mordechai Yosef, serves as Radziner Rebbe in the Bayit VeGan neighborhood of Yerushalayim. Among many other noted Talmudic academies, Rav Moshe learned at the Yeshiva of Rabbi Meir Soloveitchik in Yerushalayim.

Grand Rabbi Yerucham Leiner of Radzin BP

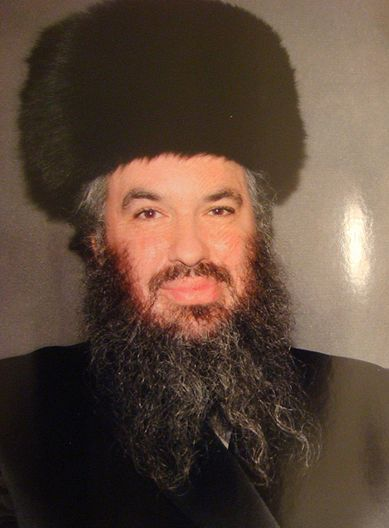
Grand Rabbi Yaakov Leiner of Radzin BP

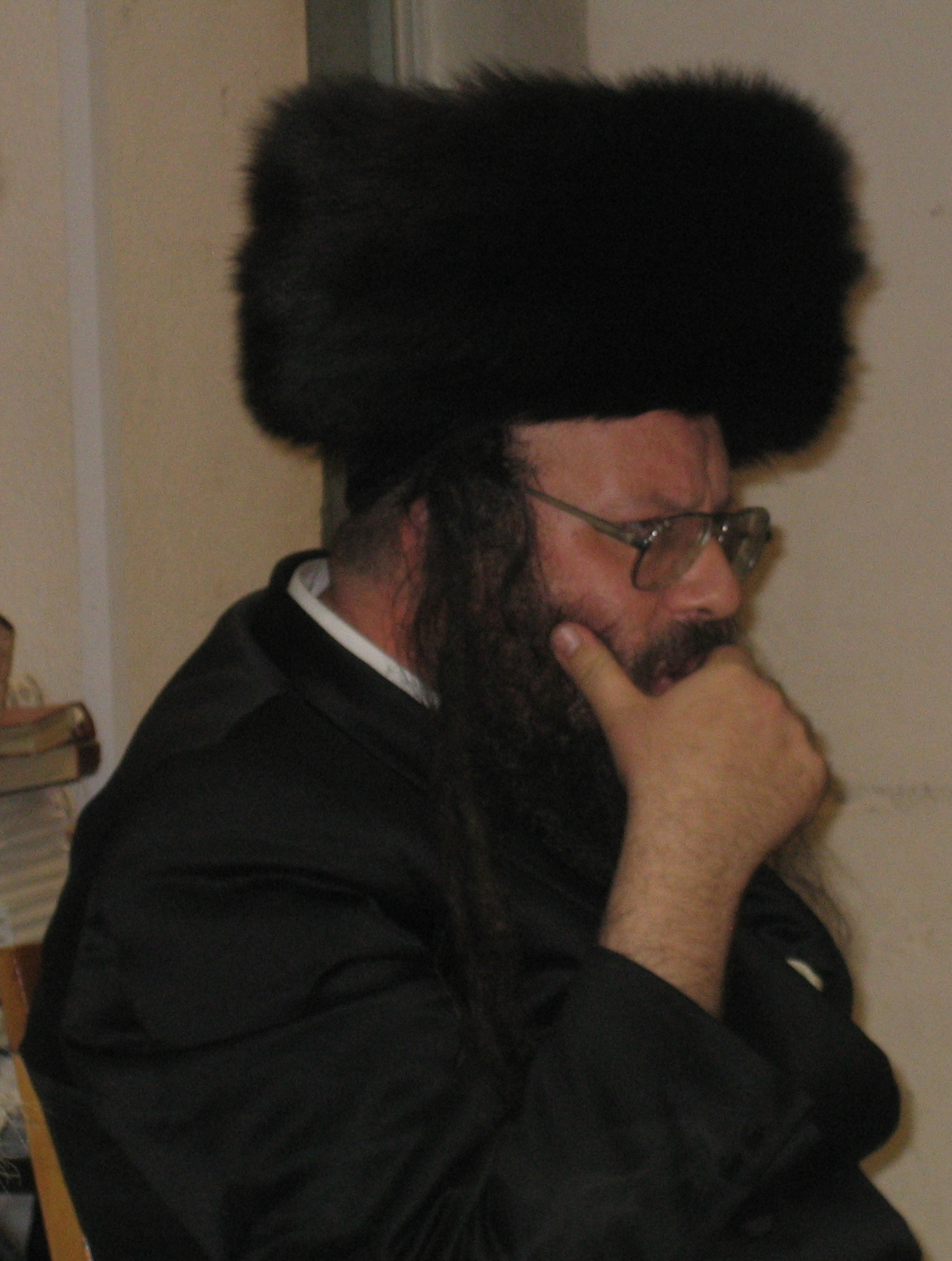
Grand Rabbi Moshe Leiner of Radzin, about to give over a Dvar Torah at Tish for the Yahrtzeit of the Mei HaShiloach 7 Teves 5768 (2008)

== Biskivitz-Reivitz branch ==
In the second generation, after the death of the Beis Yaakov, his younger brother, Rabbi Shmuel Dov Asher Leiner, became Rebbe to a small and select group. At first he remained in Izhbitza, moving shortly after to the city of Biskivitz. The Biskivitzer Rebbe's ideas were printed in Naos Deshe. He died Acharaon Shel Pesach, 22 Nisan 5665 (1905), and was buried in Biskivitz.

After the death of the Naos Deshe, his followers appointed his nephew, Rabbi Moshe Chaim Sochachevsky, in his place. Rav Moshe Chaim was a son-in-law of the Beis Yaakov, and a grandson of Rabbi Dovid Sochachevski, father-in-law of the Beis Yaakov. Rav Moshe Chaim relocated to the city of Reivitz, hence being known as the Reivitzer Rebbe. After his death, his son, Rabbi Yehoshua Avraham Alter Sochachevski, became Reivitzer Rebbe. In his later years, he moved to Chelm. The Reivitzer Rebbe, with his children and son-in-law, Rabbi Gershon Henoch Leiner, (son of Rabbi Chanina Dovid Leiner of Tomashov), were killed by the Nazi murderers.

== Picture gallery ==
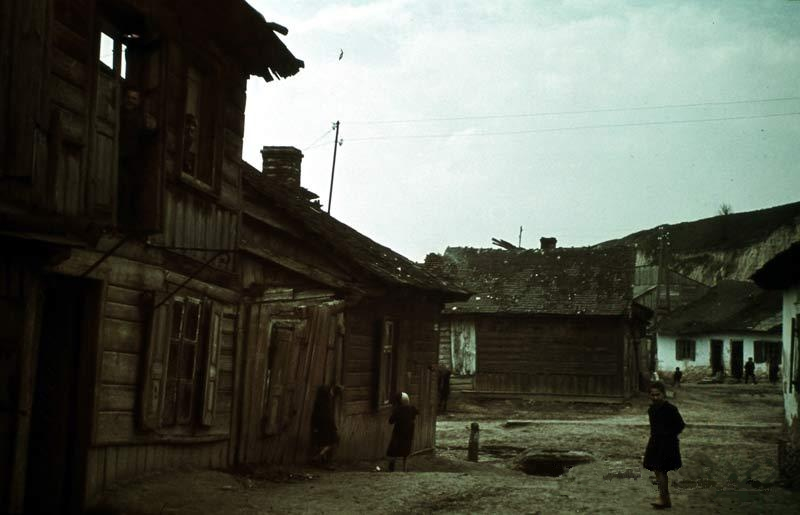
Izhbitza Ghetto, circa World War II

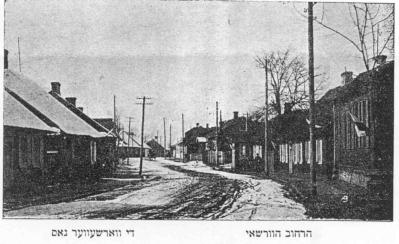
Photo of Warsaw Street in town of Radzin, Pre-WWII

Photo of main street in town of Radzin, Pre-WWII

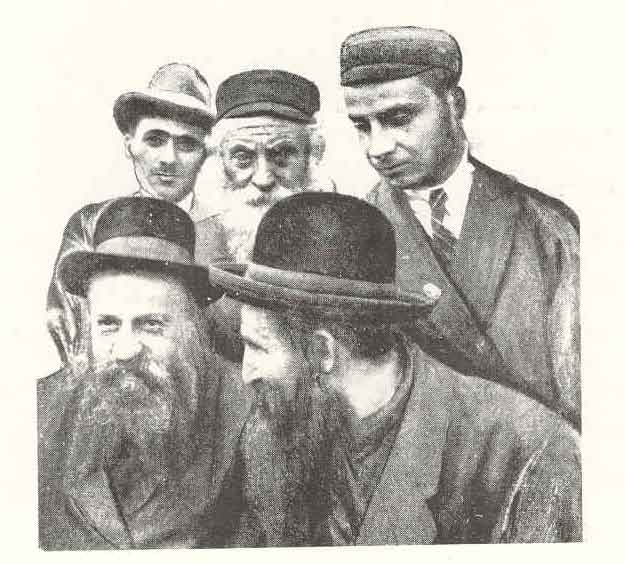
Grand Rabbi Mordechai Yosef Elazar Leiner of Radzin - the Tiferes Yosef (sitting left)

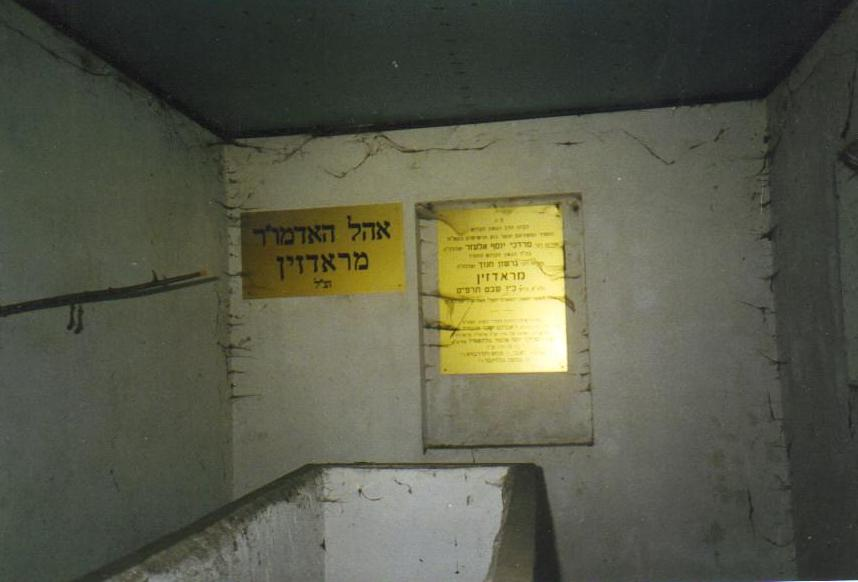
Burial place of the Tiferes Yosef, in Warsaw. Rebuilt after the holocaust by his son-in-law and successor Grand Rabbi Avrohom Yissochor Englard of Radzin and his grandson Rabbi Mordechai Yosef Elazar Goldschmidt

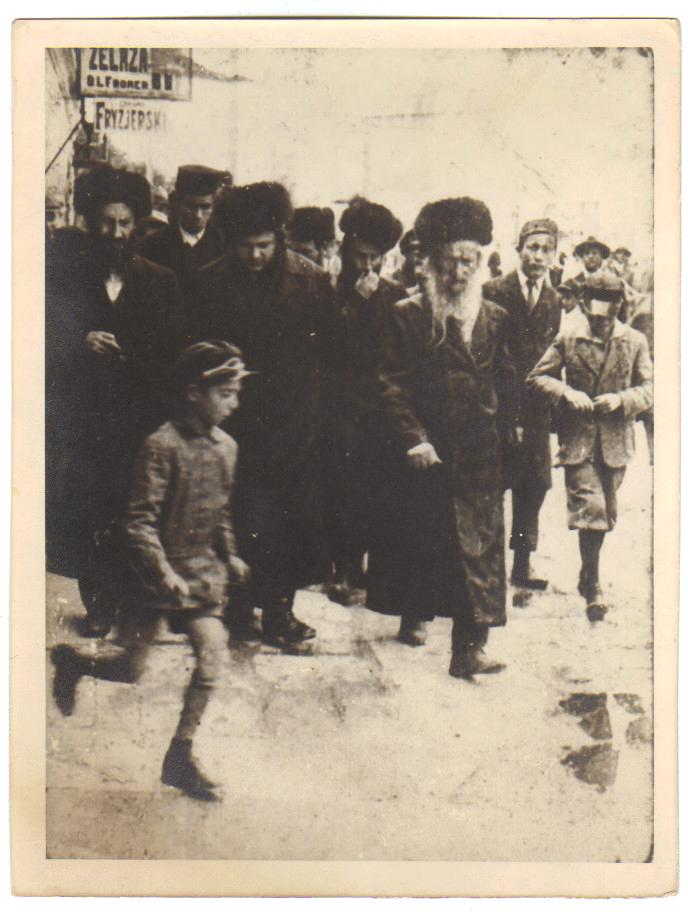
Grand Rabbi Shmuel Shlomo Leiner of Radzin (second from left - with black beard) with a group of Radziner Hasidim in pre-war Europe

Grand Rabbi Shmuel Shlomo Leiner of Radzin (on left) with the Kolbialer Rav, one of the Rebbeim at the famous Lubliner Yeshiva

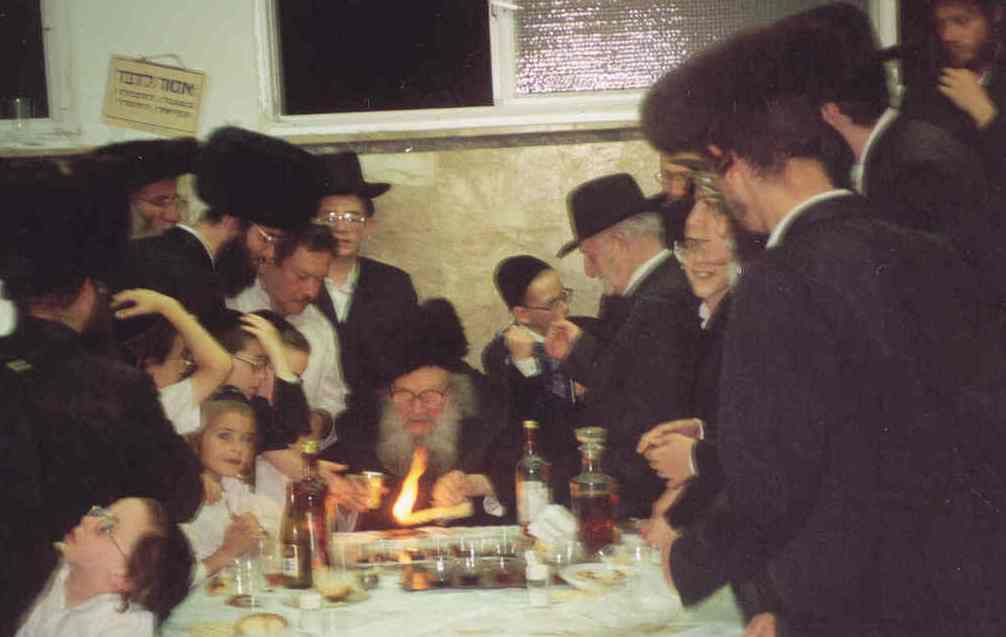
Grand Rabbi Avraham Yissachor Englard of Radzin at Havdalah following the Yahrtzeit Tisch of his brother-in-law Grand Rabbi Shmuel Shlomo Leiner of Radzin 29 Iyar 5756 (1996), at the Central Radziner Institution in Bnei Brak

Grand Rabbi Avrohom Yissachor Englard of Radzin, on his left (our right) is seen Grand Rabbi Shlomo Yosef Englard of Radzin, with a group of Radziner Chasidim

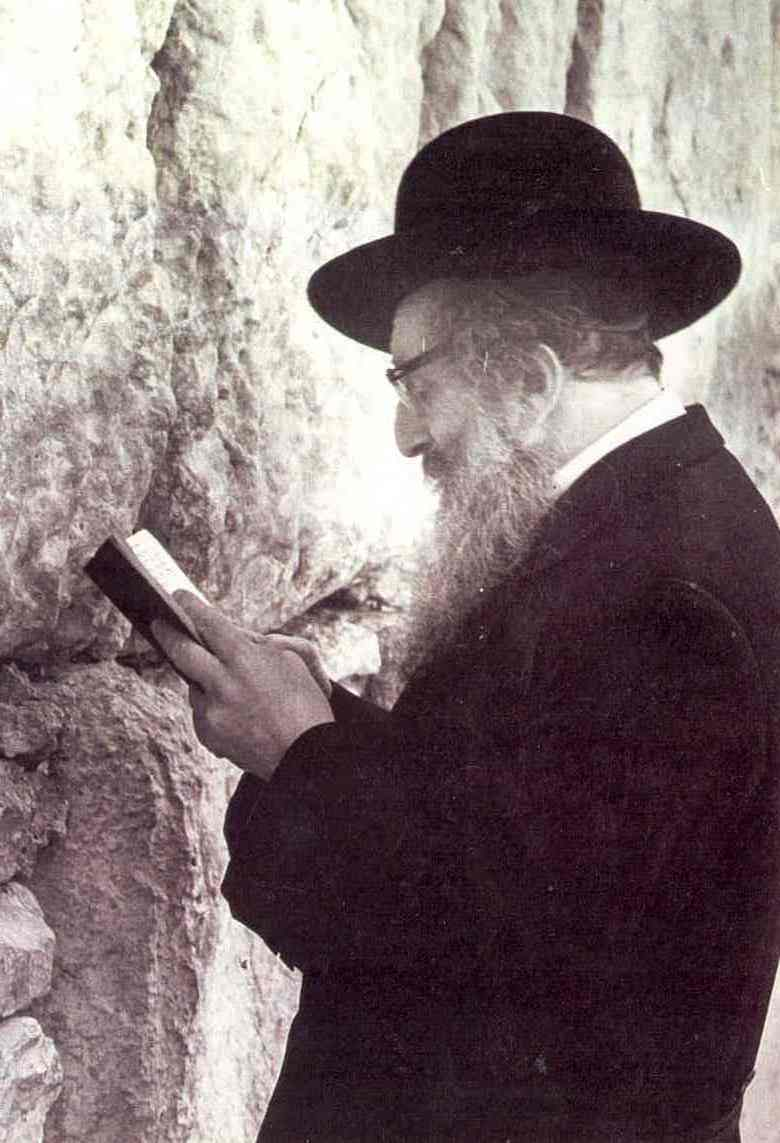
Grand Rabbi Avraham Yissachor Englard of Radzin praying at the Kosel

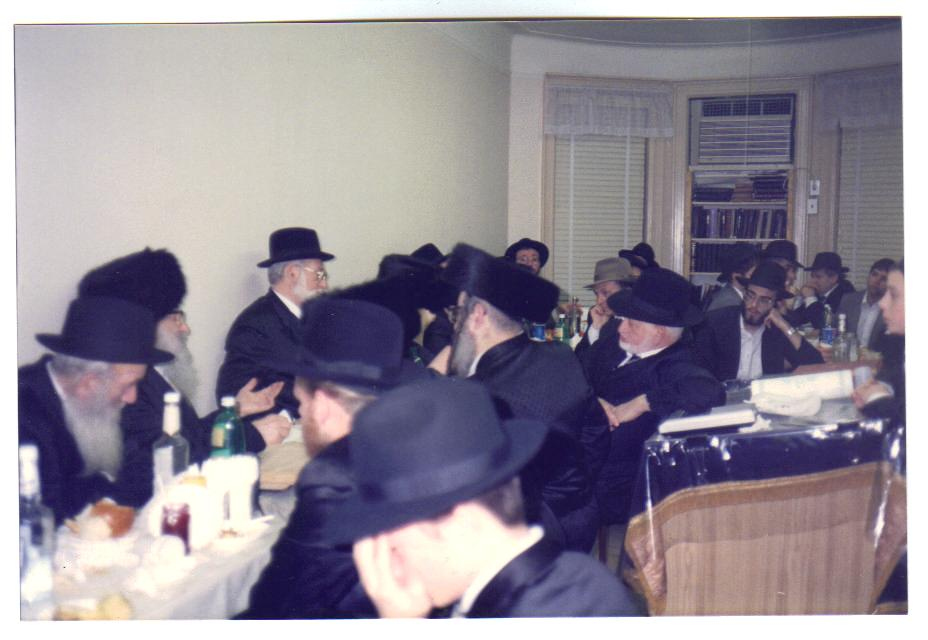
Radziner Chassidim in the US at the Tisch of their Rebbe Grand Rabbi Avraham Yissochor Englard of Radzin commemorating the Yahrtzeit of his father-in-law the Tiferes Yosef - at his shtiebel in Crown Heights, Brooklyn - 26 Shvat 5751 (1991)

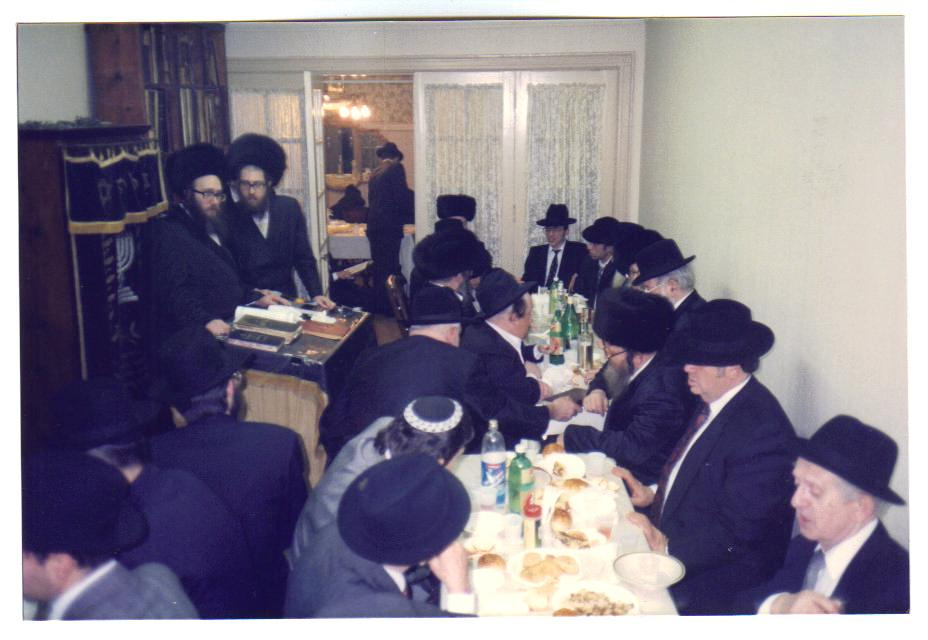
Radziner Chasidim in the USA commemorating the Yahrtzeit of the Tiferes Yosef at the shtiebel in Crown Heights - 26 Shvat 5751 (1991)

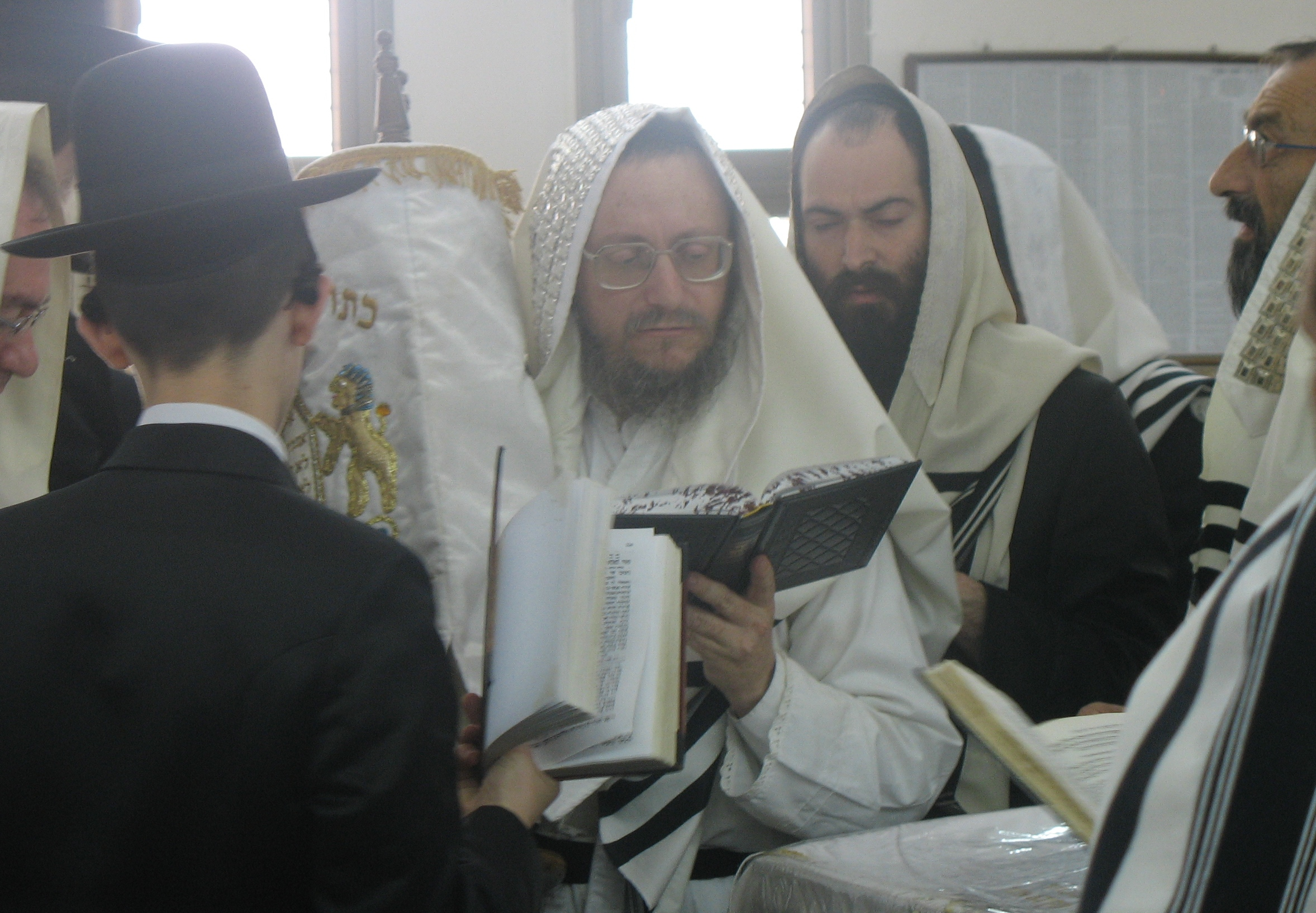
Grand Rabbi Shlomo Yosef Englard of Radzin Hoshana Rabbah in the Central Radziner Shul in Bnei Brak

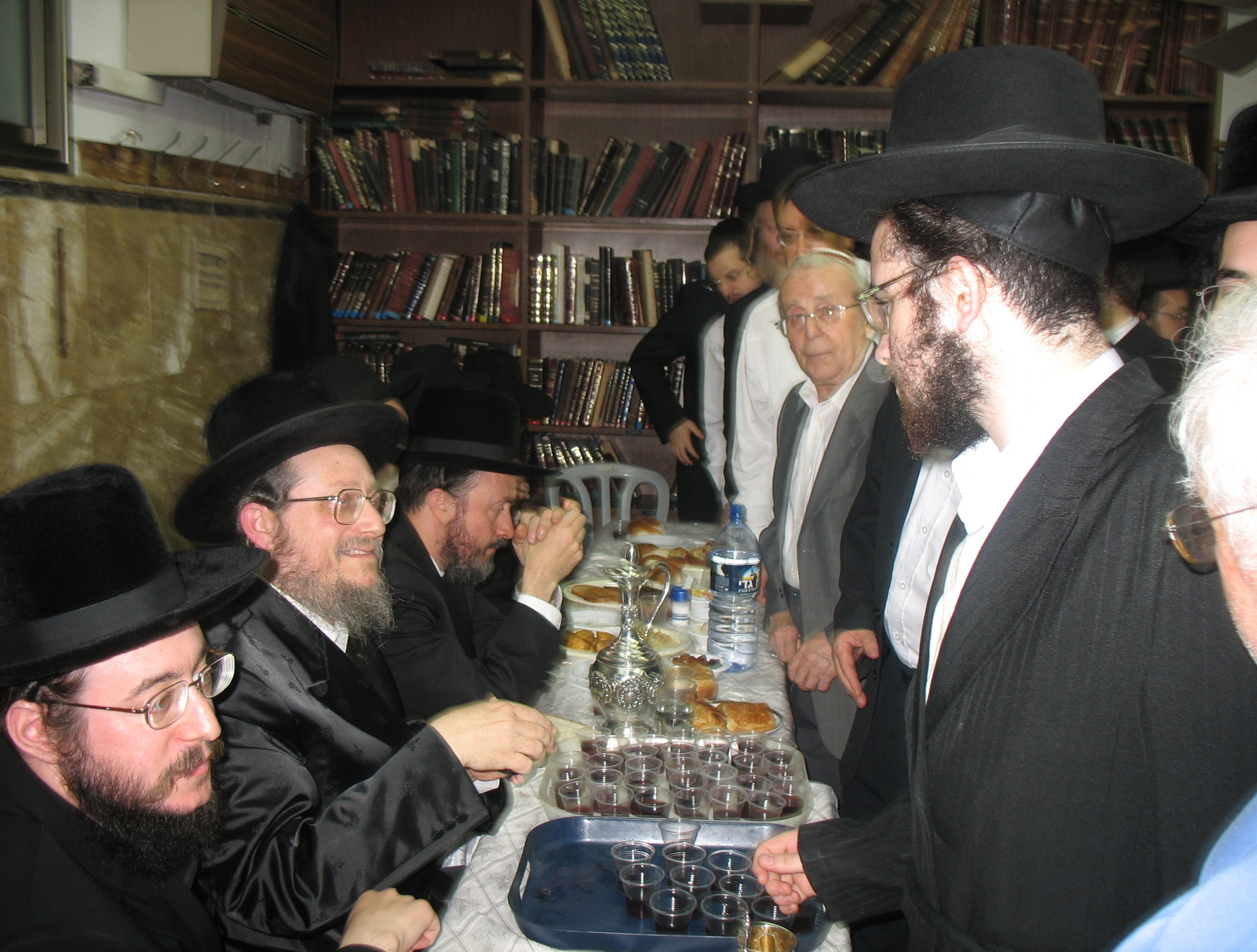
L to R: Grand Rabbi Shlomo Yosef Englard of Radzin at a Tisch in the Central Radzin Institutions in Bnei Brak. To the right is Rabbi Yitzchok Englard of Radzin-Bnei Brak, to the left is Rabbi Nosson Nochum Englard of Radzin-Yerushalayim

Grand Rabbi Shlomo Yosef Englard of Radzin (left) with Rabbi Nosson Nachum Englard of Radzin-Yerushalayim (right)

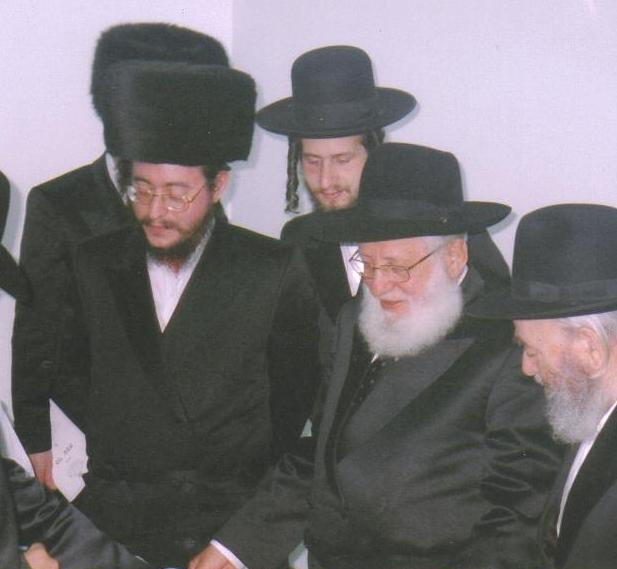
Rabbi Nosson Nochum Englard of Radzin-Yerushalayim with a group of Radziner Chassidim

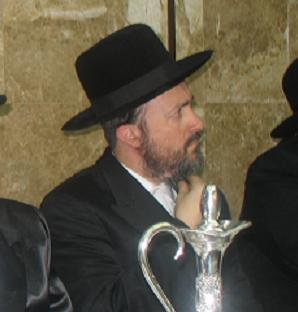
Rabbi Yitzchok Englard of Radzin-Bnei Brak

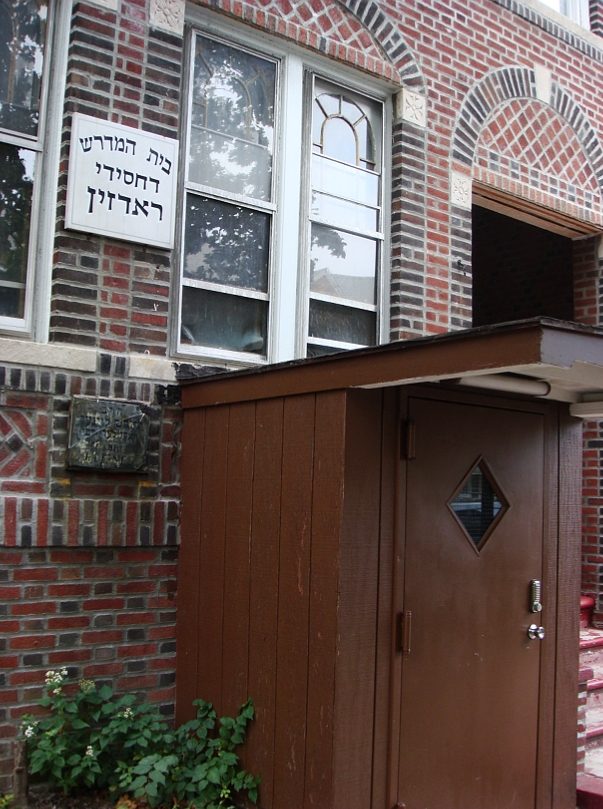
The Radziner Shtiebel/Beis Midrash in Boro Park

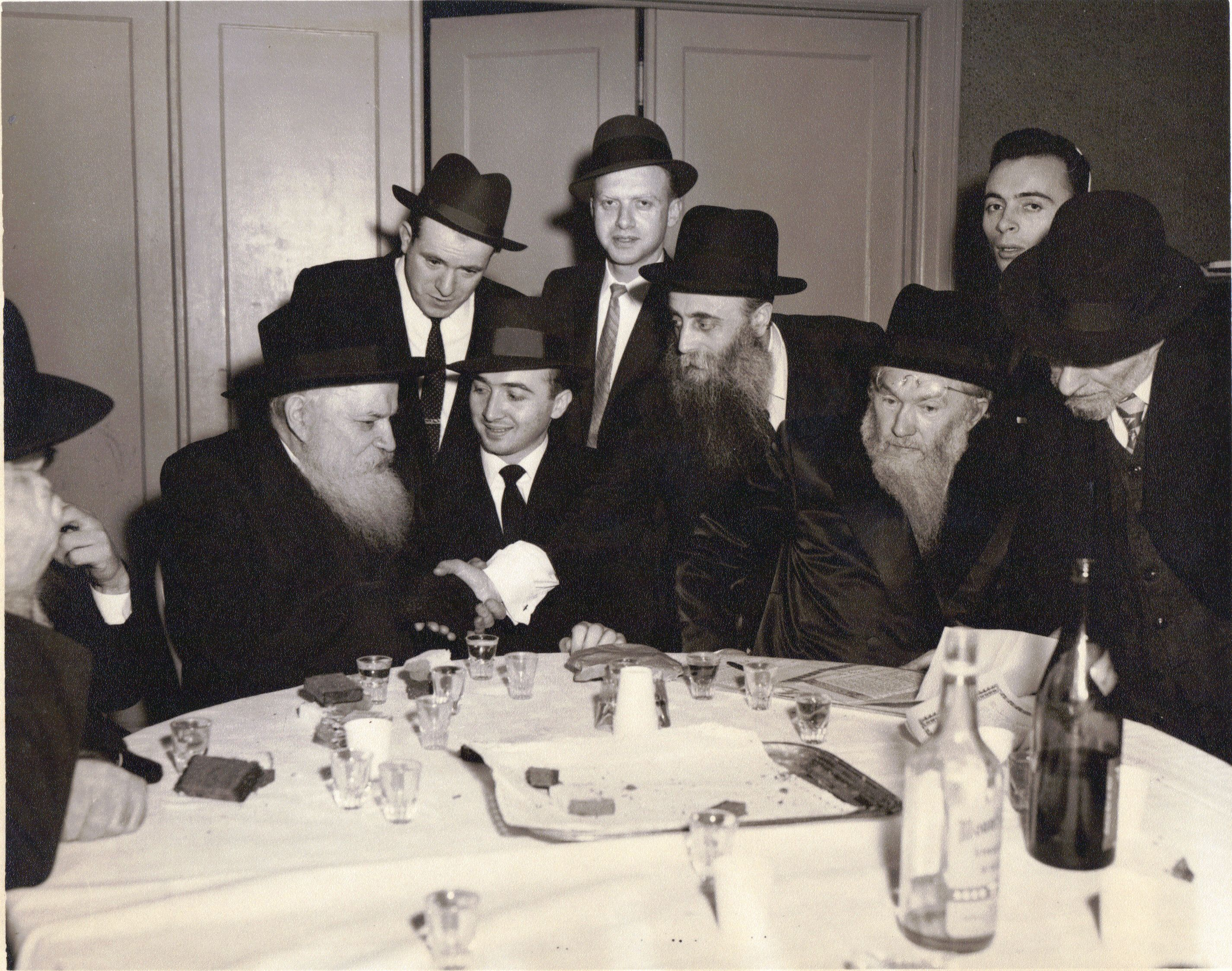
Grand Rabbi Yerucham Leiner of Radzin at the wedding of Meir Aspes, 13 November 1958

Grand Rabbi Yerucham Leiner of Radzin speaking
