= Nosson Nochum Englard =

American rabbi

Rabbi Nosson Nochum Englard נתן נחום אנגלרד
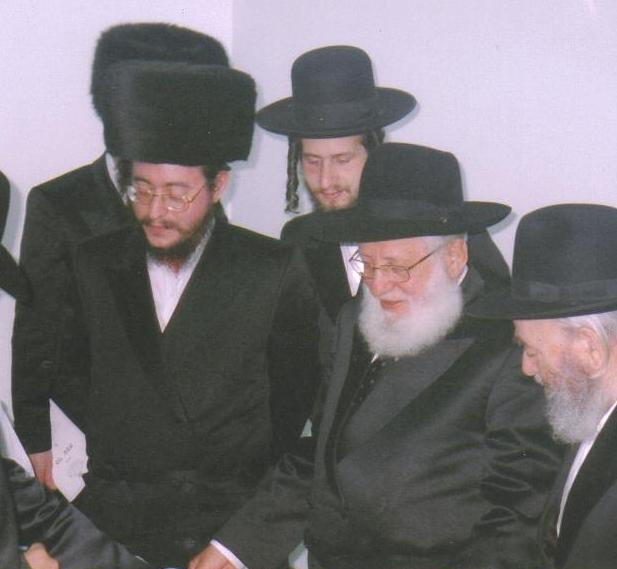
- Englard with a group of Radziner Chassidim
- Title: Radzin-Yerushalayim Rebbe

Personal life
- Born: Brooklyn, New York, US
- Parents: Rabbi Yeshayahu Englard (II) (father); Faiga Tewel (mother)
- Dynasty: Radzin

Religious life
- Religion: Judaism

Jewish leader
- Predecessor: Rabbi Avrohom Yissochor Englard
- Dynasty: Radzin

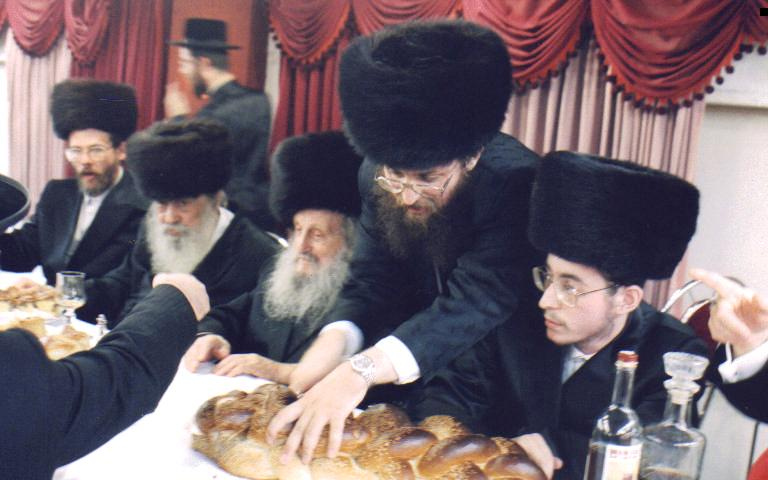
Grand Rabbi Avraham Yissachor Englard of Radzin with his eldest grandson, Rabbi Nosson Nachum Englard of Radzin-Yerushalayim (seated right)

Rabbi Nosson Nochum Englard (Hebrew: נתן נחום אנגלרד) of Radzin-Yerushalayim is a scion of Radomsk and the rabbi of the Radziner hassidim in Jerusalem.

== Biography ==
Englard was born in Brooklyn, New York, to Rabbi Yeshayahu Englard, who was one of the rabbonim of the Radomsker Shul in Brooklyn and the eldest son of Grand Rabbi Avrohom Yissochor Englard of Radzin. His mother is a daughter of Rabbi Tzvi Hirsch Tewel, a Rav and Rosh Yeshiva in Poland and in the US. Englard studied at Yeshivas Novominsk under the leadership of Grand Rabbi Yaakov Perlow of Novominsk. He remained a very close disciple of Rabbi Perlow until the latter's death in 2020.

Englard had a close relationship with his grandfather, Grand Rabbi Avrohom Yissochor Englard, who took an active role in his education and upbringing.

== Radziner Rav ==
During the last years of Rabbi Avrohom Yissochor, Englard was appointed to guide and lead the young generation of Radziner chassidim. After the passing of his grandfather in 2005, Englard was appointed to be Rav of the Radziner shtiebel and the Radziner chassidim in Jerusalem. In 2009, he was also appointed to be the Rav of the new shtiebel in the Flatbush (Midwood\Marine Park) section of Brooklyn.

In addition to serving as Rav to the above-mentioned communities, Englard gives discourses in the Torah of Izhbitza-Radzyn dynasty. These lectures are usually given in the Radziner shtiebel in Jerusalem, although he travels to many yeshivas and communities throughout Israel and abroad with a goal to spread the Izhbitza-Radzin ideology to Jews of diverse backgrounds.
