= Shmuel Shlomo Leiner =

Rabbi Shmuel Shlomo Leiner
- Grand Rabbi Shmuel Shlomo Leiner of Radzin (on the left) with the Kolbialer Rov (one of the teachers at the famous Lubliner Yeshiva)
- Title: Radziner Rebbe

Personal life
- Born: 1909
- Died: 1942 (aged 32–33) Włodawa, Poland
- Buried: Włodawa, Poland
- Spouse: Shifra Mirel Kalish
- Parent: Rabbi Mordechai Yosef Elazar Leiner (father)
- Dynasty: Radzin

Religious life
- Religion: Judaism

Jewish leader
- Predecessor: Rabbi Mordechai Yosef Elazar Leiner
- Successor: Rabbi Avrohom Yissochor Englard
- Yahrtzeit: 29 Iyar
- Dynasty: Radzin

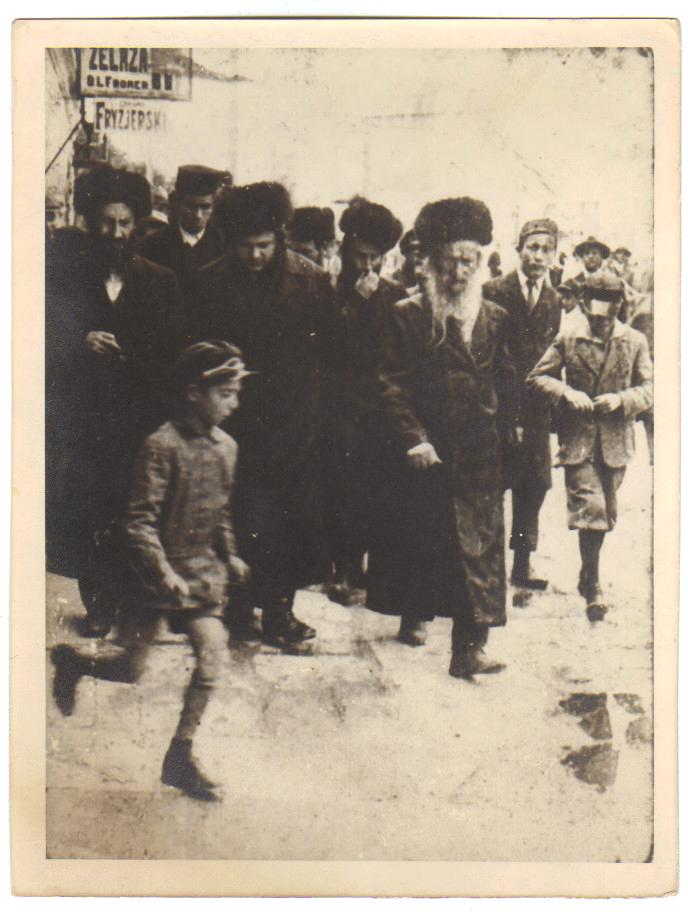
Grand Rabbi Shmuel Shlomo Leiner of Radzin (second from left - with black beard) with a group of Radziner Hasidim in pre-war Europe

Grand Rabbi Shmuel Shlomo Leiner (1909–1942) was the Radziner Rebbe (the fifth Rebbe of the Izhbitza – Radzin Hasidic dynasty).

== Early years ==
Rabbi Shmuel Shlomo Leiner was born in 1909. He was the son of Rabbi Mordechai Yosef Elazar Leiner, who was the Radziner Rebbe and author of Tiferes Yosef. In 1928 he married Shifra Mirel Kalish, the daughter of Grand Rabbi Yosef Kalish of Amshinov who was also the Rabbi of Ostrów Mazowiecka. After his marriage, he lived near his father-in-law.

== Radziner Rebbe ==
In 1929, Rabbi Leiner's father died and he reluctantly agreed to succeed his father as Radziner Rebbe. The Rebbe was greatly respected for his great knowledge of Torah, by many Litvishe Gedolim, even being at such a young age. Initially, he settled in Warsaw where his father had lived. In 1934 he moved to Radzyń Podlaski where he established the Radziner Yeshiva Sod Y'sharim and appointed his brother-in-law (and future successor) Rabbi Avrohom Yissochor Englard to oversee it. Prior to World War II, the Sod Y'sharim-Radzin yeshiva grew into a network consisting of 7 yeshivos which were located in various cities throughout Poland.

== During the Holocaust ==
The Rebbe was known for encouraging resistance to the orders of the Nazis and the Judenrat and for urging people to break out of the ghettos, flee to the forests and take up arms. (Although he never made it to the woods himself, his brother-in-law, Rabbi Avraham Yissachor Englard, fled to the forest and joined the partisans with a group of Radziner Chasidim.) The story goes that in his last moments, the Rebbe was wrapped in his father's tallis as a German soldier took him into the Włodawa cemetery at gunpoint. At one point, the Nazi pushed him. The Rebbe turned around, slapped him across the face, and kicked him. This obviously degraded the German greatly, thus stunning him by showing the inner power of the Jewish people. The Rebbe was immediately shot to death on that day, 29 Iyar 5702 (1942). Buried in Włodawa.

== See also ==
Izhbitza - Radzin (Hasidic dynasty)
