= List of Talmudic tractates =

The Mishnah consists of six divisions known as Sedarim or Orders. The Babylonian Talmud (Talmud Bavli) has Gemara—rabbinical analysis of and commentary on the Mishnah—on 37 masekhtot (pronounced [/maˈsɛχtot/]; Hebrew: מַסֶּכְתּוֹת, lit. 'tractates'; sg. מַסֶּכֶת, masekhet). The Jerusalem Talmud (Talmud Yerushalmi) has Gemara on 39 masekhtot. The Talmud is the central text of Rabbinic Judaism and the primary source of Jewish religious law (Halakha) and Jewish theology.

== Structure ==
Every printed masekhet ('tractate') of the Talmud Bavli begins on page 2 (with the exception of tractates Middot, Tamid and Kinnim), making the actual page count one less than the numbers below.

While the Talmud Bavli has had a standardized page count for over 100 years based on the Vilna Edition Shas (i.e., the Vilna edition), the standard page count of the Yerushalmi used in most modern scholarly literature is based on the 1523 Bomberg Talmud, which uses folio (#) and column number ('a', 'b', 'c', and 'd'; e.g., tractate Berakhot 2d would be folio page 2, column 4). A modern alternative page count and numbering system for the Yerushalmi was published by Oz Vehadar in the 2010s, which is used in the table that follows.

Masekhet	Chapters	Mishnayot	Pages of Gemara Talmud Bavli	Pages of Gemara Talmud Yerushalmi
Seder Zeraim (11 masekhtot)	75	655	63	744
Berakhot	9	57	64	94
Pe'ah	8	69	—N/a	73
Demai	7	53	—N/a	77
Kil'ayim	9	77	—N/a	84
Shevi'it	10	89	—N/a	87
Terumot	11	101	—N/a	107
Ma'aserot	5	40	—N/a	46
Ma'aser Sheni	5	57	—N/a	59
Challah	4	38	—N/a	49
Orlah	3	35	—N/a	42
Bikkurim	4	39	—N/a	26
Seder Moed (12 masekhtot)	88	681	731	620
Shabbat	24	139	157	113
Eruvin	10	96	105	71
Pesachim	10	89	121	86
Shekalim	8	52	22 Talmud Yerushalmi	61
Yoma	8	61	88	57
Sukkah	5	53	56	33
Beitza	5	42	40	49
Rosh Hashanah	4	35	35	27
Ta'anit	4	34	31	31
Megillah	4	33	32	41
Mo'ed Katan	3	24	29	23
Chagigah	3	23	27	28
Seder Nashim (7 masekhtot)	71	578	605	418
Yevamot	16	128	122	88
Ketubot	13	111	112	77
Nedarim	11	90	91	42
Nazir	9	60	66	53
Sotah	9	67	49	52
Gittin	9	75	90	53
Kiddushin	4	47	82	53
Seder Nezikin (10 masekhtot)	74	685	682	301
Bava Kamma	10	79	119	40
Bava Metzia	10	101	119	35
Bava Batra	10	86	176	39
Sanhedrin	11	71	113	75
Makkot	3	34	24	11
Shevu'ot	8	62	49	49
Eduyot	8	74	—N/a	—N/a
Avodah Zarah	5	50	76	34
Pirkei Avot	6	108	—N/a	—N/a
Horayot	3	20	14	18
Seder Kodashim (11 masekhtot)	91	590	558	—N/a
Zevahim	14	101	120	—N/a
Menachot	13	93	110	—N/a
Chullin	12	74	142	—N/a
Bekhorot	9	73	61	—N/a
Arachin	9	50	34	—N/a
Temurah	7	35	34	—N/a
Keritot	6	43	28	—N/a
Me'ilah	6	38	22	—N/a
Tamid	7	34	8	—N/a
Middot	5	34	3 mishnayot	—N/a
Kinnim	3	15	4 mishnayot	—N/a
Seder Tohorot (12 masekhtot)	126	1,003	72	11
Keilim	30	254	—N/a	—N/a
Oholot	18	134	—N/a	—N/a
Nega'im	14	115	—N/a	—N/a
Parah	12	96	—N/a	—N/a
Tohorot	10	92	—N/a	—N/a
Mikva'ot	10	71	—N/a	—N/a
Niddah	10	79	73	11
Makhshirin	6	54	—N/a	—N/a
Zavim	5	32	—N/a	—N/a
Tevul Yom	4	26	—N/a	—N/a
Yadayim	4	22	—N/a	—N/a
Uktzim	3	28	—N/a	—N/a
63 masechtot	525	4,192	2,711	2,094

Masechtot Shekalim, Middot and Kinnim are printed in the editions of the Babylonian Talmud despite there not being Babylonian Talmud gemara.

In addition to the tractates of the Mishnah and Tosefta, there are also the Minor Tractates (Hebrew: מסכתות קטנות), a collection of short treatises dealing with various ethical and ritual topics not covered in the main Talmudic tractates. For more information, see Minor tractate.

== See also ==
- Mishnah
- Talmud
