= Seder ha-Mishmarah =

Mizrahi Jewish study cycle

The Seder ha-Mishmarah is a study cycle devised by the Rabbi Yosef Hayyim and used by some Mizrahi Jews (Jews originating in the Muslim world) for reading the whole of the Hebrew Bible and the Mishnah over a year. It depends on the cycle of the weekly Torah portions read in the synagogue.

Some communities have a custom of public reading, whereby on each Shabbat afternoon, the whole of the mishmarah for the following Shabbat is read aloud. In others, individuals use it as a basis for private study. The usual form of the cycle is set out in the table below.

Weekly Torah portion	Nevi'im	Ketuvim	Mishnah
Bereshit, Gen. 1:1–6:8	Joshua 1–11	Psalms 1–11	Ḥagigah
Noaḥ, Gen. 6:9–11:32	Joshua 12–19	Psalms 12–20	Kinnim
Lekh Lekha, Gen. 12:1–17:27	Joshua 20–end	Psalms 21–34	Ma'aserot and Ma'aser Sheni
Vayera, Gen. 18:1–22:24	Judges 1–11	Psalms 35–42	Pe'ah
Ḥayye Sarah, Gen. 23:1–25:18	Judges 12–end	Psalms 43–51	Kiddushin
Toledot, Gen. 25:19–28:9	I Samuel 1–8	Psalms 52–65	Berakhot
Vayetze, Gen. 28:10–32:3	I Samuel 9–13	Psalms 66–73	Ketubot
Vayishlaḥ, Gen. 32:4–36:43	I Samuel 14–25	Psalms 74–79	Mo'ed Katan and Horayot
Vayeshev, Gen. 37:1–40:23	I Samuel 26–end, II Samuel 1–7	Psalms 80–90	Yevamot
Mikketz, Gen. 41:1–44:17	II Samuel 8–18	Psalms 91–106	Mikva'ot
Vayigash, Gen. 44:18–47:27	II Samuel 19–end	Psalms 107–119	Kelim
Vayḥi, Gen, 47:28–50:26	I Kings 1–6	Psalms 120–136	Bekhorot
Shemot, Ex. 1:1–6:1	I Kings 7–10	Psalms 137–150	Ta'anit and Megillah
Va'era, Ex. 6:2–9:35	I Kings 11–19	Job 1–6	Makkot
Bo, Ex. 10:1–13:16	I Kings 20 to II Kings 5	Job 7–12	Nega'im
Beshallaḥ, Ex. 13:17–17:16	II Kings 6–12	Job 13–20	Eruvin
Yitro, Ex. 18:1–20:23	II Kings 13–18	Job 21–25	Pirke Avot and Avodah Zarah
Mishpatim, Ex. 21:1–24:18	II Kings 19–end	Job 26–28	Bava Kamma
Terumah, Ex. 25:1–27:19	Jeremiah 1–8	Job 29–38	Middot
Teṣawweh, Ex. 27:20–30:10	Jeremiah 9–17	Job 39–end	Tevul Yom
Ki Tissa, Ex. 30:11–34:35	Jeremiah 18–31	Esther 1–end	Sheqalim
Vayakhel, Ex. 35:1–38:20	Jeremiah 32–37	Song of Songs 1–end	Shabbat
Pekude, Ex. 38:21–40:38	Jeremiah 38–48	Proverbs 1–6	Tohorot and Yadayim
Vayiqra, Lev. 1:1–5:26	Jeremiah 49–end	Proverbs 7–12	Zevaḥim
Ṣaw, Lev. 6:1–8:36	Ezekiel 1–9	Proverbs 13–17	Menaḥot
Shemini, Lev. 9:1–11:47	Ezekiel 10–17	Proverbs 18–22	Ḥullin
Tazriaʿ, Lev. 12:1–13:59	Ezekiel 18–22	Proverbs 23–27	Niddah
Metzora, Lev. 14:1–15:33	Ezekiel 23–27	Proverbs 28–30	Zavim
Aḥare Mot, Lev. 16:1–18:30	Ezekiel 28–30	Proverbs 31–end	Keritot
Qedoshim, Lev. 19:1–20:27	Ezekiel 31–40	Daniel 1–3	Orlah
Emor, Lev. 21:1–24:23	Ezekiel 41–43	Daniel 4–6	Betzah and Yoma
Behar, Lev. 25:1–26:2	Ezekiel 44–46	Daniel 7–8	Shevi'it
Bəḥuqqoṯay, Lev. 26:3–27:34	Ezekiel 47–end	Daniel 9–end	Arakhin
Bemidbar, Num. 1:1–4:20	Isaiah 1–5	Ezra 1–5	Makhshirin
Naso, Num. 4:21–7:89	Isaiah 6–9	Ruth 1–end	Nazir and Sotah
Bəhaʿalot̲ək̲ā, Num. 8:1–12:16	Isaiah 10–13	Ezra 6–end	Tamid
Shelaḥ Lekha, Num. 13:1–15:41	Isaiah 14–20	Nehemiah 1–5	Ḥallah
Qoraḥ, Num. 16:1–18:32	Isaiah 21–24	Nehemiah 6–end	Terumot
Ḥukkat, Num. 19:1–22:1	Isaiah 25–29	I Chronicles 1–5	Parah
Balaq, Num. 22:2–25:9	Isaiah 30–33	I Chronicles 6–11	Oholot
Pinḥas, Num. 25:10–30:1	Isaiah 34–40	I Chronicles 12–17	Bava Batra
Mattot, Num. 30:2–32:42	Isaiah 41–44	I Chronicles 18–23	Nedarim
Masse, Num. 33:1–36:13	Isaiah 45–49	I Chronicles 24–end	Eduyot
Devarim, Deut. 1:1–3:22	Isaiah 50–58	Lamentations 1–end	Bava Metzia
Va'etḥhannan, Deut. 3:23–7:11	Isaiah 59–end	II Chronicles 1–4	Shevu'ot
Ekev, Deut. 7:12–11:25	Hosea 1–6	II Chronicles 5–8	Kil'ayim
Re'eh, Deut. 11:26–16:17	Hosea 7–12	II Chronicles 9–14	Pesaḥim , Rosh Hashanah and Sukkah
Shofetim, Deut. 16:18–21:9	Hosea 13–end	II Chronicles 15–24	Sanhedrin
Ki Tetze, Deut. 21:10–25:19	Joel 1–end and Amos 1–end	II Chronicles 25–27	Gittin
Ki Tavo, Deut. 26:1–29:8	Obadiah 1–end, Jonah 1–end and Micah 1–end	II Chronicles 28–34	Biqqurim
Nitzavim, Deut. 29:9–30:20	Nahum 1–end, Habakkuk 1–end, Zephaniah 1–end and Haggai 1–end	II Chronicles 35–end	Me'ilah
Vayelekh, Deut. 31:1–31:30	Zechariah 1–11	Ecclesiastes 1–5	Demai
Haazinu, Deut. 32:1–32:52	Zechariah 12–end	Ecclesiastes 6–9	ʿUqṣim
Wəzot̲ habBərāk̲ā, Deut. 33:1–34:12	Malachi 1–end	Ecclesiastes 10–end	Temurah

This cycle is unrelated to that for Chok l'Yisrael, which is a study cycle based on the works of Hayyim ben Joseph Vital and revised by Chaim Joseph David Azulai. This too is often published in book form and is widely popular among Near and Middle Eastern Jews. Differences between the two are:

- The Seder ha-Mishmarah does not include Targum or commentaries on the Torah portion; Chok l'Yisrael includes both;
- Chok l'Yisrael does not include the whole of Nevi'im, Ketuvim or the Mishnah, and does not present the excerpts in a continuous order through the year;
- Chok l'Yisrael also includes excerpts from the Talmud, the Zohar and works of Jewish law and morality;
- Chok l'Yisrael is designed for daily rather than weekly reading.

== Other uses ==
In Mishnaic Hebrew mishmarah (or mishmeret) means a "watch", usually a one-third division of the night. In Temple times, a mishmar (or mishmarah) also referred to a group of priests whose turn it was to officiate.

In addition to the study cycle described above, the term mishmarah is used for a nocturnal prayer or study session preceding a celebration such as a wedding or a Brit milah or a festival such as Hoshana Rabba or following a death. This usage was derived either from the above meaning as a watch in the night or from the practice of watching over a corpse. However, by folk etymology the word is sometimes interpreted as a portmanteau of "Mishnah" and "Gemara", to refer to the texts studied.

== See also ==
- Other study cycles under Torah study #Study cycles

== External links and references ==
Endnotes

References and external links

- Ḥoq le-Ya'aqov, which sets out all the readings in book form
- Table at end of Tefillat Yesharim (Iraqi prayer book)
- Mishmarah tab on http://www.pizmonim.org website
