= Tractate (Talmud) =

One of the tractates of the Mishnah or Babylonian or Jerusalem Talmud

A tractate (Hebrew: מַסֶּכֶת masekhet, Sephardic: [mɑːˈsɛxɛt], Ashkenazic: [mɑːˈsɛxɛs]; plural: מַסֶּכְתּוֹת masekhtot) is an organizational element of Talmudic literature that systematically examines a subject.

A tractate/masekhet consists of chapters (perakim; singular: פרק perek).

== Etymology ==
The word masechet – in its pausal form, masachet (מַסָּכֶת) – appears in the Hebrew Bible denoting web or texture (Judges 16:13–14). The plain Hebrew meaning of the word is the warp and weft used in weaving. By extension, the word has been used to refer to a work of in-depth examination of a topic comprising discussions, research and conclusions. It refers in particular to the sections of the Mishnah, Tosefta, Beraita, and Gemara of the Babylonian and Yerushalaim Talmuds.

== Usage ==
The "major" tractates, those of the Mishnah itself, are organized into six groups, called sedarim, while the minor tractates, which were not canonized in the Mishnah, stand alone.

The Mishnah comprises sixty-three tractates, each of which is divided into chapters and paragraphs. The same applies to the Tosefta. Each tractate is named after its principal subject, e.g., Masekhet Berakhoth, Masekhet Shabbath, or Masekhet Sanhedrin. The Aramaic word masekhta (מסכתא) is used interchangeably with the Hebrew word masekhet.

The following are the tractates of the Mishnah, in the six divisions known as Sedarim (Orders):

- Zeraim (Seeds) זְרָעִים
  - Berakhot
  - Pe'ah
  - Demai
  - Kil'ayim
  - Shevi'it
  - Terumot
  - Ma'aserot
  - Ma'aser Sheni
  - Challah
  - Orlah
  - Bikkurim
- Moed (Festival) (מוֹעֵד)
  - Shabbat
  - Eruvin
  - Pesahim
  - Shekalim
  - Yoma
  - Sukkah
  - Beitza
  - Rosh Hashanah
  - Ta'anit
  - Megillah
  - Mo'ed Katan
  - Hagigah
- Nashim (Women) (נָשִׁים)
  - Yevamot
  - Ketubot
  - Nedarim
  - Nazir
  - Sotah
  - Gittin
  - Kiddushin
- Nezikin (Damages) (נְזִיקִין)
  - Bava Kamma
  - Bava Metzia
  - Bava Batra
  - Sanhedrin
  - Makkot
  - Shevu'ot
  - Eduyot
  - Avodah Zarah
  - Avot
  - Horayot
- Kodashim (Holies) (קָדָשִׁים)
  - Zevachim
  - Menachot
  - Hullin
  - Bekhorot
  - Arakhin
  - Temurah
  - Keritot
  - Me'ilah
  - Tamid
  - Middot
  - Kinnim
- Tohorot (Purities) (טָהֳרוֹת)
  - Keilim
  - Oholot
  - Nega'im
  - Parah
  - Tohorot
  - Mikva'ot
  - Niddah
  - Makhshirin
  - Zavim
  - Tevul Yom
  - Yadayim
  - Uktzim

The Babylonian Talmud has Gemara—rabbinical analysis of and commentary on the Mishnah—on thirty-seven tractates; the Jerusalem Talmud has Gemara on thirty-nine tractates.

The fifteen Minor tractates are usually printed at the end of Seder Nezikin in the Talmud. They contain diverse subjects such as Aggadah including folklore, historical anecdotes, moral exhortations, practical advice in various spheres, laws and customs pertaining to death and mourning, engagement, marriage and co-habitation, deportment, manners and behavior, maxims urging self-examination and modesty, the ways of peace between people, regulations for writing Torah scrolls, Mezuzah, and Tefillin and for making Tzitzit, as well as conversion to Judaism.

Rabbinic literature that expounds upon such Talmudic literature may organize itself similarly (e.g. the Halachot by Alfasi), but many do not (e.g. Mishneh Torah by Maimonides). Non-Mishnaic literature, such as Midrash, even when from the Mishnaic-era, is not organized into tractates.
