= Abraham of Montpellier =

Abraham ben Yitzchak of Montpellier, also known as Avraham min haHar (lit. "Abraham from the mountain") (d. 1315) is known as a commentator on the greater part of the Talmud. He lived in mountain city of Montpellier, in the Provence section of France. Towards the end of his life he moved to Carpentras and became a member of the Beth Din of Rabbi Mordechai ben Josepha, (author of Shaarei Nedarim).

He was a contemporary and friend of Menachem Meiri. Both are known to have been followers to the Maimonidean approach to halacha, often explaining Talmudic passages according to the halachic conclusions codified by Maimonides.

== Works ==
His commentary on tractate Kiddushin was published in Vlina editions of the Talmud Bavli mistitled Tosafos Ri HaZaken, an error noted by the editors of the Vilna Edition Shas, who prove that the commentary could not have been written by the Ri Hazaken. Rabbi Abraham's commentaries to tractates Yevamos, Nedarim, Nazir, Rosh HaShannah, Yoma, and Sukkah have been published in recent years. Additionally his commentary on Chullin is currently under production. His commentaries on Chullin and Kesubos are quoted by Jacob ben Moses of Bagnols, who wrote between 1357 and 1361, and by Menachem di Lonzano, who lived in the second half of the sixteenth century.

He has been mistaken for the father of the celebrated anti-Maimonist Solomon ben Abraham of Montpellier, who flourished in the middle of the thirteenth century. Isaac de Lattes, in his "Sha'are Zion" (ed. Buber, p. 42), names Rabbi Abraham among the scholars of the generation succeeding Solomon, of whose father he speaks simply as "Abraham", without the title of rabbi.
