= Gershon Henoch Leiner =

Grand Rabbi Gershon Chanoch Henech Leiner of Radzyn (1839 – December 15, 1890) was a rebbe of the Izhbitza – Radzin dynasty, and the first to be known as "the Radzyner Rebbe".

== Biography ==
He was born in Izbica, Poland in 1839, where he studied until his grandfather's death in 1854. His father was R. Jacob, the second rebbe of the Izbica-Radzyn dynasty; his grandfather, Mordechai Yosef Leiner, the Mei Hashiloach. He was a prolific writer of a large number of commentaries, including Sidrei Taharot, a Gemara-style work on the Talmudic tractates Kelim and Oholot. Leiner died 4 Teves 5651 (December 15, 1890) and was buried in Radzyn.

== Scholarship ==
He was the author of Orchos Chayim, Sod Y'sharim, Tiferes Hachanochi, and Dalsos Shaar Ha'ir, among many other seforim.

He is referred to by Radzyner Chasidim as the Orchos Chayim, based on his phenomenal work on the Tzava'ah (will) of R' Eliezer HaGadol. He wrote this work in only 12 days, nearly without access to any books, during his trial on a libel fabricated against him by his adversaries. When the Rebbe published this work, he commented to his chasidim that he was happy that he got to print his Tzava'ah.

At the age of sixteen, the Rebbe had already formulated a spectacular idea: he would compose a "gemara" of a sort on the mishnayos of Seder Taharos, as there is no Talmud Bavli on those tractates. In order to accomplish this, he gathered all the relevant material from the whole Talmud Bavli, Talmud Yerushalmi, and all other Braysos etc., and presented them in chronological order in a sefer he called Sidrei Taharos on Maseches Keilim. He later did the same with all the other tractates of Seder Taharos. However, only his works on Keilim and Oholot were published, as Sidrei Taharot. (The other tractates were lost during the Holocaust.) The task took him ten years to complete.

=== Tekhelet ===
The Rebbe was reputed to be brilliant in both the revealed and the hidden Torah. He was also extremely knowledgeable in several scientific fields, like chemistry, engineering, and medicine. He spoke several languages fluently, and used them frequently while prescribing medicines in Latin to the countless people who turned to him for help.

He worked tirelessly for the restoration of the techeiles of the tzitzis. He made use of his vast knowledge to research the topic, and traveled to Italy four times to conduct his study. While there he visited what was then the largest aquarium in the world (in Naples), and after studying the different sea creatures, concluded that the original blue color for the Techeiles was extracted from the secretion of the common cuttlefish (Sepia officinalis; Hebrew: דְּיוֹנוּן). Legend has it that on one of his visits to Rome, he succeeded in persuading the Vatican to allow him a quick glimpse of the Holy Vessels of the Beis HaMikdosh, to match his findings with the techeiles on the priestly garments.

He published several books on the topic, such as S'funei T'munei Chol, P'sil T'cheles, and Ein HaT'cheles, and succeeded in influencing many Gedolim with his work. At the same time, there were Gedolim who opposed the Rebbe's opinion and did not agree with his findings. There was, however, a small number of Gedolei Yisrael who would practice the rediscovered mitzvah of techeiles, like Rabbi Sholom Mordechai Schwadron (known as the Maharsham of Berzan) who possessed a tallis with techeiles fringes. All the Rebbe's chassidim and followers wore them, as do many Breslov chassidim to this day.

His identification of the cuttlefish as the source of techeiles was not widely accepted and was, in fact, the subject of great controversy. Years later, Rabbi Yitzchak Isaac Halevi Herzog challenged that identification and showed that the cuttlefish dye was actually the synthetic Prussian blue.
