= Raphael Cohen =

18th-century German rabbi

Rabbi Raphael Susskind Cohen
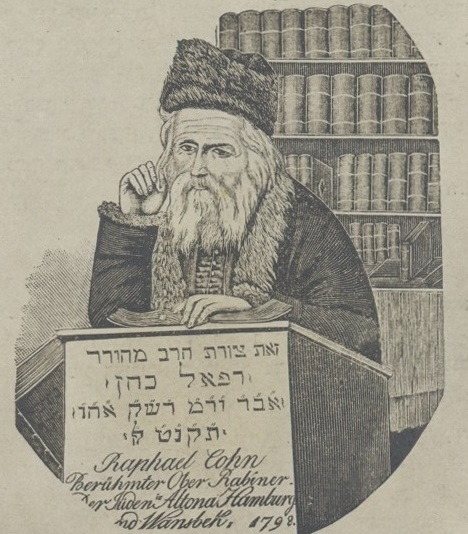
- Title: Rabbi

Personal life
- Born: Rafael ben Jekutiel Süsskind Kohen; 4 November 1722
- Died: 11 November 1803 (aged 81) Altona
- Parent: Jekutiel (father)

Religious life
- Religion: Judaism

Rabbi Raphael ben Jekuthiel Susskind Cohen, in German Rafael ben Jekutiel Süsskind Kohen (Lithuania, 4 November 1722 – Altona, 11 November 1803), a kohen, was Chief Rabbi of Altona-Hamburg-Wandsbek from 1775.

He was educated at Minsk under Aryeh Löb ben Asher, whose successor as head of the yeshibah of that town he became in 1742. In 1744 he was called to the rabbinate of Rakov, and in 1747 to that of Vilkomir (a town not far from Wilna), where he remained till 1757, when he was called as chief rabbi to Minsk. Six years later he became rabbi and head of the yeshibah at Pinsk. In 1771 he went to Berlin for the purpose of publishing there his work "Torat Yekutiel." The scholars of that city received him with enthusiasm and respect, and offered him the rabbinate, which was then vacant, but for some unknown reason he declined the offer. In 1772 he became rabbi of Posen, and four years afterwards he was called to take charge of the "Three Communities" (Altona, Hamburg, and Wandsbeck).

For twenty-three years he ministered to these congregations, and then retired from active service, spending the remainder of his life among his former parishioners. How highly his work was esteemed may be inferred from the fact that the King of Denmark, to whose territory these congregations belonged, upon hearing of Raphael's resignation, sent him a letter in which he expressed his appreciation of the service he had rendered to the Jewish community.

Raphael was Mendelssohn's bitterest opponent, and attempted to ban Jewish readers from reading Mendelssohn's Biur (Pentateuch translation) while it was still in manuscript, but ultimately was unable to oppose translation of the Pentateuch when Mendelssohn arranged for the ruler of Altona, Christian VII of Denmark, to subscribe to a copy.

Raphael fought against all modern culture, and on one occasion fined a man for wearing his hair in a cue.

Raphael is said to have refused to participate in the excommunication initiated against the Shneur Zalman of Liadi based on his claim that greater challenges face one wishing to initiate punishment than one wishing to initiate blessing.

Both Ḥayyim of Volozhin (1749–1821) and his elder brother Simḥah (d. 1812) studied under R. Raphael.

== Rabbinic literary works ==
Raphael, was the author of the following works:

1. תורת יקותיאל Torat Yekutiel (Berlin, 1772), novellæ and comments on the Shulḥan 'Aruk, Yoreh De'ah (to the end of paragraph 106), appended to which are some responsa. It was against this work that Saul Berlin wrote his "Miẓpeh Yekutiel" (ib. 1789).
2. מרפא לשון Marpe Lashon (ib. 1790), lectures on ethics.
3. "Vshav HaKohen" ושב הכהן [and the Kohen shall return]. hebrewbooks.org (in Hebrew). Bnei Brak. 1988 [Originally published Altona, 1792]. p. 480.
4. שאלת הכהנים תורה Sha'alat ha-Kohanim Torah (Altona, 1792), novellæ and comments on the Talmudic treatises Zebaḥim, Menaḥot, 'Arakin, Temurah, Keritot, Yoma, and Me'ilah.
5. זכר צדיק Zeker Ẓaddiḳ (ib. 1805), his last two public lectures.
