= Abraham ben Hezekiah Hazkuni =

Abraham ben Hezekiah Ḥazkuni

Personal life
- Born: 1627 Kraków, Polish–Lithuanian Commonwealth
- Died: Tripoli, Ottoman Syria

Religious life
- Religion: Judaism

Abraham ben Hezekiah Ḥazkuni (Hebrew: אברהם בן יחזקיה חזקוני; born 1627) was a Galician Talmudist and Kabbalist. He was a disciple of Yom-Tov Lipmann Heller.

Ḥazkuni published Zot Ḥuqqat ha-Torah, an abridged version of Isaac Luria's Sefer ha-Kavanot, in Venice in 1659. His work Shete Yadot, a collection of sermons arranged according to the weekly Torah portions, was published by his son in Amsterdam in 1726. His commentary on the Zohar divided into two volumes, Yad Ramah and Yad Adonai, is preserved in manuscript form. Ḥazkuni also wrote the two-volume work Zera‘ Abraham—one volume consisting of sermons and the other containing novellae on tractates Beẓah and Mo‘ed Ḳatan—and the work Yodea‘ Binah.
