= Inverted nun =

Classical Hebrew glyph

Inverted Nun
נון הפוכה	׆	׆ וַיְהִי
compare with brackets
[׆ וַיְהִי ... יִשְׂרָאֵל ׆]
compare with Nun
נ ׆

׆
Inverted nun – text

Ordinary letter nun

Inverted nun - vertical flip

Inverted nun - horizontal flip

Inverted nun - Z-shape

Inverted nun (נו"ן מנוזרת "isolated nun" or נו"ן הפוכה "inverted nun" or "׆" in Hebrew) is a rare glyph used in classical Hebrew. Its function in the ancient texts is disputed. It takes the form of the letter nun in mirror image, and appears in the Masoretic text of the Tanakh in nine different places:

- Numbers - twice, 10:35–36: the two verses are delineated by inverted nuns, sometimes isolated outside the passage text and sometimes embedded within words in verses 10:35 and 11:1.
- Psalms - seven times in Psalm 107 (vs 23-28, vs 40)

The images at right show three common variants of the inverted nun – vertically flipped, horizontally flipped, and Z-shaped. Other renderings exist, corresponding to alternative interpretations of the term "inverted". It may also occur with a dot above.

== Occurrence and appearance ==
Inverted nuns are found in nine passages of the Masoretic Text of the Bible. The exact shape varies between different manuscripts and printed editions. In many manuscripts, a reversed nun is found, referred to as a "nun hafucha" by the Masoretes. In some earlier printed editions, they are shown as the standard nun upside down or rotated, presumably because the printer did not want to design a new rare character. Recent scholarly editions of the Masoretic text show the reversed nun as described by the Masoretes. In some manuscripts, however, other symbols are occasionally found instead. These are sometimes referred to in rabbinical literature as "simaniyot" (markers).

In the Torah, the inverted nuns frame the text:

Whenever the ark set out, Moses said, "Rise up, Lord! May your enemies be scattered; may your foes flee before you." Whenever it came to rest, he said, "Return, Lord, to the countless thousands of Israel."

— Numbers 10:35–36

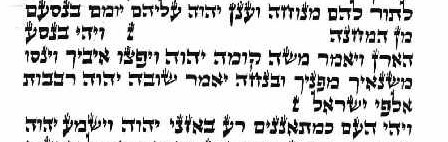
Inverted nuns in the Book of Numbers

The nuns are generally positioned close to, but not touching, the first and last words of the couplet. They are supposed to be positioned between the gaps in between the paragraphs, but there is disagreement as to how this should be done. Some texts invert the existing nuns in the Torah text and don't add inverted nuns before and after it.

Rashi's commentary states that the name of the city of Haran at the end of the Torah portion Noach also occurs with an inverted nun, but this is not found in existing texts.

== Rabbinic basis ==
The Babylonian Talmud records in the tractate Shabbath, folio 116a, that the markings surrounding Numbers 10:35–36 were thought to denote that this 85-letter text was not in its proper place. One opinion states that it would appear in another location which discusses the order of tribal column, with the position of the Ark already stated there.

The 85-letter text found between the nuns is also said to be denoted because it is the model for the fewest letters which constitute a 'text' which one would be required to save from fire due to its holiness. It also suggests that the inverted nuns may suggest the Hebrew word נֵר ner, meaning 'a light'.

The tractate Shabbat in the Talmud says regarding the inverted nuns:

It is taught in a baraita: "ויהי בנסוע הארון ויאמר משה" – The Holy One, blessed be He, placed signs above and below this portion, to say that this is not its place. Rabbi [Judah haNasi] said: It was not for this reason, but rather because it is an important book in and of itself.

— Shabbat 115b–116a

Sifrei explains these "signs":

It was marked with points above and below.

— Sifrei

The Talmud continues, stating that as this section is a separate book, the portions of Numbers before and after it also count as books and thus the Torah contains seven books in total:

For R. Shemuel bar Nahmani said in the name of R. Yohanan: “She hath hewn out her seven pillars” (Proverbs 9:1) – these are the seven books of the Pentateuch; according to whom? According to Rabbi [Judah Hanasi].

— Shabbat 115b–116a

Bar Kappara is known to have considered the Torah as composed of seven volumes in the Gemara "The seven pillars with which Wisdom built her house (Prov. 9:1) are the seven Books of Moses". Genesis, Exodus and Leviticus and Deuteronomy as we know them but Numbers was really three separate volumes: Num 1:1 to Num 10:35, followed by Numbers 10:35–36, and the third text from there to the end of Numbers.

R. Shimon Ben Gamliel says: This section will be uprooted from its place and written in its rightful place in the future (but for now it is in its correct location). Why is it written here? So as to separate between first and second retribution [3]. Second retribution is "and the people grumbled". First retribution is "and they traveled from the mountain of G-d (i.e., they eagerly run away from G-d's presence)". Where is it its appropriate place? Rav Ashi says: "In the section dealing with the disposition of the Israelites according to their banners and their travelling arrangements" (Numbers 1:52-2:34, Shabbath 116a).

The Mishnah, in tractate Yadayim, states:

A book that became erased yet there remain in it 85 letters, like the section "and it was when the Ark was carried", renders hands impure

— Yadaim 3,5

According to Midrash:

These verses were incorporated into the Torah from the prophecy of Eldad and Meidad. Their prophecy so remained and was explained by the prophet Ezekiel: "So says the Lord, G-d: Are you the one of whom I have spoken in the days of yore through prophets of Israel? And some say that there was a hidden book (of prophecy).

— Midrash Chaseiros V'Yoseiros

The two nuns are similar to khaf and reish – to say that they are ach and rak ("only" and "however"). Ach and rak always exclude – to say that this is not the place of this section. Rabbi [Judah haNasi] says because it is a book of its own.

— (Lekach Tov)

Maharshal ruled that the Talmud only mandates the usual break for a parashah section, and Torah scrolls with extra letters are passul (unfit for ritual use). Rabbi Yechezkel Landau, however, defends the custom, stating that punctuation such as inverted nuns doesn't count as extra letters and thus don't invalidate the scroll.

== Elsewhere ==
Inverted nun appears to have been used as a scribal or editorial annotation or text-critical mark.

The primary set of inverted nuns is found surrounding the text of Numbers 10:35–36. The Mishna notes that this text is 85 letters long and dotted. The demarcation of this text leads to the later use of the inverted nun markings. Saul Lieberman demonstrated that similar markings can be found in ancient Greek texts where they are also used to denote 'short texts'. Greek sources, especially Alexandrian ones, refer to the sign as reversed sigma.

== Unicode ==
The inverted nun is not part of any word, and is never pronounced; thus it is classed as punctuation and not a letter.

Glyph	Unicode	Name
׆	U+05C6	HEBREW PUNCTUATION NUN HAFUKHA
