= Mordechai Yosef Leiner =

Polish rabbi

- Title: Izhbitzer Rebbe

Personal life
- Born: Mordechai Yosef Leiner; 1801 Tomaszów Lubelski
- Died: 7th January 1854 (7 Teves 5614)
- Buried: Izhbitza
- Children: Yaakov Leiner Shmuel Dov Asher Leiner
- Parent: Yaacov Leiner of Tomashov (father)
- Dynasty: Izhbitza-Radzyn

Religious life
- Religion: Judaism

Jewish leader
- Predecessor: (founder)
- Successor: Yaakov Leiner
- Began: 1839
- Ended: 1854
- Main work: Mei HaShiloach
- Dynasty: Izhbitza-Radzyn

Mordechai Yosef Leiner of Izbica (מרדכי יוסף ליינר) known as "the Ishbitzer" (Yiddish: איזשביצע, איזביצע Izhbitze, Izbitse, Ishbitze) (1801-1854) was a rabbinic Hasidic thinker and founder of the Izhbitza-Radzyn dynasty of Hasidic Judaism. He is best known for his work Mei Hashiloach.

== Biography ==
Mordechai Yosef Leiner was born in Tomashov (Polish: Tomaszów Lubelski) in 1801. His father Yaakov, who died when he was two, was the son of Mordechai of Sekul, a descendant of Rabbi Saul Wahl. He became a disciple of Simcha Bunim of Peshischa where he joined Rabbi Menachem Mendel of Kotzk and Rabbi Yosef of Yartshev; both were also born in Tomashov. When Menachem Mendel became Rebbe in Kotzk, Leiner became his disciple there; then in 1839 became himself a rebbe in Tomaszów, moving subsequently to Izbica.

His leading disciple was Rabbi Yehuda Leib Eiger (1816-1888), grandson of Rabbi Akiva Eiger. His students included Rabbi Zadok HaKohen of Lublin (1823–1900), his son, Rabbi Yaakov Leiner (1828–1878) and his grandson Rabbi Gershon Henoch Leiner of Radzyn.

Leiner is buried in an ohel in the Jewish cemetery in Izbica.

=== Relationship with the Kotzker Rebbe ===
Leiner was the right-hand man of the Menachem Mendel of Kotzk, by whom he was charged with overseeing the Hasidim. In 1840 Leiner had a public and dramatic falling out with him. On the day after Simchat Torah of that year, Leiner left Kotzk with many of his followers to form his own hasidic circle. The reasons given for the break are varied.

== Thought ==
Leiner is best known for his work Mei Hashiloach ("מי השילוח") a popular collection of his teachings on the weekly Torah portion and Jewish holidays, published by his grandson, Rabbi Gershon Leiner, and usually printed in 2 volumes. It has twice been translated into English.

The work was however controversial; attempts were even made to sabotage the press on which it was being printed. In particular Leiner's view regarding Free will was at serious odds with the standard Jewish view. (Note: His view has been explained as follows: "[What] the Izbicer demonstrates is that it is possible for agents to be free, relative to the fiction that they live in, whilst wholly determined from a God’s eye view. On the other hand, the Izbicer admits that we can’t actually break out of our perspective to see the sense in which we are determined. Nevertheless, he holds that we sometimes get some sort of mystical glimpse... For the Izbicer, human freedom is real. It’s as real as anything can be. On the other hand, there is a sense, that we can’t fully grasp, in which our existence, and our every action, is dependent upon the will of God. For that reason, the Izbicer is willing, in certain moods, to twist the famous Talmudic dictum radically, until it reads: 'All is in the hands of heaven, even the fear of heaven.'" (The reference is to Berakhot 33b, "All is in the hands of Heaven except the fear of Heaven;" see discussion under Hashkafa.)) Here Leiner expressed the doctrine that all events, including human actions, are absolutely under God's control, or as Rabbinic discourse would phrase it, by "hashgacha pratis." Thus, if everything is determined by God, then even sin is done in accordance with God's will. He presents defenses of various Biblical sins, such as Korach's rebellion, Zimri during the Heresy of Peor, and Judah's incident with Tamar.

One of his most cited comments is on Leviticus 21:1 "None shall defile himself for any [dead] person among his kin." Rabbi Leiner read the verse as a warning against the defilement of the soul. The soul is defiled when it is infected with the bitterness and rage that comes with senseless suffering and tragedy. Those who — like the Kohanim— would serve God, are commanded to find the resources to resist the defilements of despair and darkness. Despair is the ultimate denial of God, and surrender to darkness is the ultimate blasphemy.

=== Influence ===
Leiner's thought influenced (mostly indirectly, through the work of his student, Tzadok Hakohen) the mussar of Rabbi Isaac Hutner and Rabbi Moshe Wolfson. Leiner's thought continued to have influence in the twentieth century, especially on Neo-Hasidism, and the teachings of Rabbi Shlomo Carlebach.

Carlebach is credited with the recent popularization of Rabbi Leiner's teachings. He apparently came across Leiner's work in an old Jewish book store. He is quoted as saying that after initially being perplexed as to the peculiar nature of the teachings he quickly realized that in it lay the "secret for turning Jews on to the deeper meanings of Judaism".

== Bibliography ==
- Alan Brill, Thinking God: The Mysticism of Rabbi Zadok HaKohen Of Lublin (Yeshiva University Press, Ktav 2002)
- Morris M. Faierstein, All is in the Hands of Heaven: The Teachings of Rabbi Mordecai Joseph Leiner of Izbica (New York: Ktav, 1989) (2nd revised edition, Gorgias Press, 2005)
- Shaul Magid, Hasidism on the Margin (University of Wisc. 2003)
- Allan Nadler, "Hasidism on the Margin: Reconciliation, Antinomianism, and Messianism in Izbica/Radzin Hasidism (review)" Jewish Quarterly Review - Volume 96, Number 2, Spring 2006, pp. 276–282
- Rivka Schatz, "Autonomy of the Spirit and the Law of Moses" (Hebrew), Molad 21 (1973–1974), pp. 554–561
- Joseph Weiss, "A Late Jewish Utopia of Religious Freedom," in David Goldstein, ed., Studies in Eastern European Jewish Mysticism (Oxford: Oxford University Press, 1985)
- Jonatan Meir, "The Status of Commandments in the Philosophy of Rabbi Mordechai Joseph Leiner of Izbica’, Mishlav 35 (2000), pp. 27-53
- Herzl Hefter, "In God's Hands: the Religious Phenomenology of R. Mordechai Yosef of Ishbitz", Tradition 46:1(2013), pp. 43–65.
