= Niddah (Talmud) =

Tractate in Mishnah and Talmud

Niddah ( /ˈnɪd.ə/; Nid-ah; Hebrew: נִדָּה) is a masekhet or tractate of the Mishnah and the Talmud, and is part of the order of Tohorot. The content of the tractate primarily deals with the legal provisions related to Halakha of Niddah.

In Judaism, a niddah is a woman during menstruation, or a woman who has menstruated and not yet completed the associated requirement of immersion in a mikveh (ritual bath). In the Book of Leviticus, the Torah prohibits sexual intercourse with a niddah. The prohibition has been maintained in traditional Jewish law. The laws concerning niddah are also referred to as taharat hamishpacha (טהרת המשפחה, Hebrew for family purity).

Niddah, along with Eruvin and Yevamot, is considered one of the three most difficult tractates in the Babylonian Talmud. A Hebrew mnemonic for the three is עני (ani, meaning "poverty").

== Structure ==
Niddah consists of 10 chapters. It has 79 mishnahs and 73 pages gemara.

=== Chapter headings ===
1. Shammai Omer (שמאי אומר)
2. Hol Ka'yad (כל היד)
3. Hamapelet Chatichah (המפלת חתיכה)
4. Bnot Kutim (בנות כותים)
5. Yotzei Dofen (יוצא דופן)
6. Ba Siman (בא סימן)
7. Dan Niddah (דם הנדה)
8. Haroeh Kettem (הרואה כתם)
9. Haisha Shehi Oseh (האשה שהיא עושה)
10. Tinoket (תינוקת)

== See also ==
- Ritual purity in Judaism
