= Sanhedrin (tractate) =

Tractate of the Talmud

Tractate of the Talmud
- Seder: Nezikin
- Number of mishnahs: 71
- Chapters: 11
- Babylonian Talmud pages: 113
- Jerusalem Talmud pages: 57
- Tosefta chapters: 14

Sanhedrin (סנהדרין) is one of ten tractates of Seder Nezikin (a section of the Talmud that deals with damages, i.e. civil and criminal proceedings). It originally formed one tractate with Makkot, which also deals with criminal law. The Gemara of the tractate is noteworthy as precursors to the development of common law principles, for example the presumption of innocence and the rule that a criminal conviction requires the concurrence of twelve.

== Summary of Sanhedrin ==
Within Seder Nezikin, the Sanhedrin focuses on questions of jurisdiction, criminal law and punishments. The tractate includes eleven chapters, addressing the following topics:

1. The different levels of courts and which cases each level presides over
2. Laws of the high priest and Jewish king and their involvement in court proceedings
3. Civil suits: acceptable witnesses and judges and the general proceedings
4. The difference between criminal and civil cases, general proceedings in criminal cases
5. Court procedures, including examination of witnesses and the voting of the judges
6. Procedures for execution after condemnation, specifically by stoning
7. The 4 types of capital punishments, details of crimes which merit stoning (in fact stoning was only actually done if the convict survived being dropped off a 5-meter cliff first)
8. The rebellious son, and other crimes for which the offender is killed before committing the actual prohibition, and the commandments which Jews are to die before violating.
9. Details of crimes meriting capital punishment by burning (actually the pouring of hot lead down the throat, the Sadducee heretics instead used burning at the stake) or beheading; auxiliary punishments
10. Details of crimes meriting capital punishment by strangulation (i.e. hanging)
11. The World to Come and who does not receive it. This chapter is known individually by Helek, one of its opening words.

This is the order found in the Gemara, but the Mishna has the last 2 chapters reversed in order.

=== Chapter 3: Civil suits ===
Disqualified witnesses: Gamblers, usurers, those who engage in commerce with sabbatical year produce.
