= Nedarim (Talmud) =

Tractate of the Mishnah and the Talmud

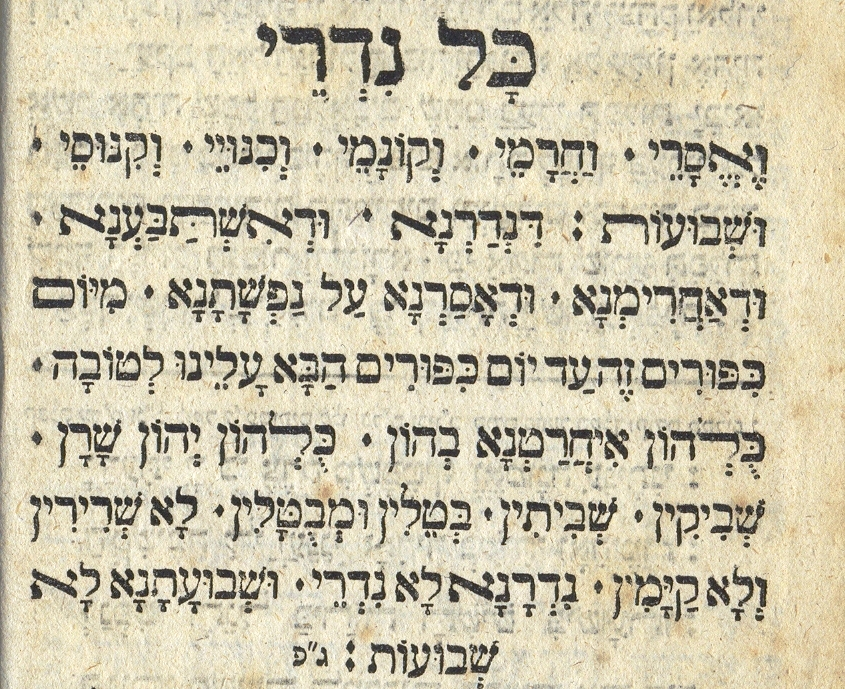
- Kol Nidrei prayer of Yom Kippur, Offenbach Machzor

Tractate of the Talmud
- Seder: Nashim
- Number of mishnahs: 90
- Chapters: 11
- Babylonian Talmud pages: 91
- Jerusalem Talmud pages: 40
- Tosefta chapters: 7

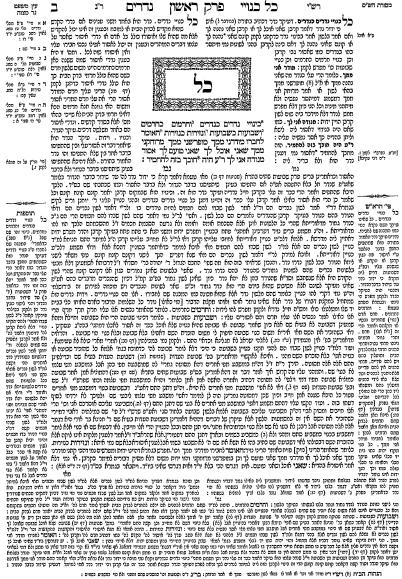

Nedarim (Hebrew: נדרים, lit. 'vows') is a masechet of the order of Nashim of the Mishnah and the Talmud. Its subject is laws relating to the neder, a kind of vow or oath in Judaism.

The place assigned to this treatise in the mishnaic order of Seder Nashim differs in the various editions, although it is generally placed third both in the Mishnah and in the Tosefta. In the Mishnah it is divided into eleven chapters containing ninety paragraphs in all.

== Contents ==
- Chapter 1: The phrases, words, and corruptions of words (e.g., "konam," "konaḥ," "konas," instead of "korban"; "ḥereḳ," "ḥerek," "ḥerep," instead of "herem"; "shebuta," "sheḳuḳa," instead of "shebu'ah") which are considered as vows, oaths, or bans (§§ 1-2); different circumlocutions for the word "korban"; names of the various kinds of sacrifices and parts of the sacrifice which are considered vows (§§ 2-4). These expressions are regarded as vows when one says: "May its use be forbidden me, as the use of a dedicated korban is forbidden"; and any of the expressions noted above or any circumlocution may be substituted for the word "korban."
- Chapter 2: If, on the other hand, one says: "May its use be forbidden me, as the use of things forbidden in the Torah" (e.g., unclean animals), this expression is not considered a vow (§ 1); for one would then be able by his own words to make things as unlawful as are the things forbidden by the Torah itself. The difference between an oath and a vow, and in what respects an oath is considered the more rigorous, and in what respects a vow is so regarded (§§ 2-3); vows with and without restrictions; the difference between the Judeans and the Galileans in regard to the ordinary "ḥerem" (§ 4); evasions which of themselves invalidate vows (§ 5).

=== Explanation of Terms ===
- Chapter 3: Enumeration of the four kinds of vows which scholars have declared invalid in themselves (§§ 1-3); persons who may be deceived by white lies; whether a false oath is permitted in case of necessity (§ 4); interpretation of certain expressions in vows; persons meant by the terms "seafarer" and "landsman." The phrase "those who rest on the Sabbath" includes the Cutæans, but "the children of Noah" are only Gentiles, and "the children of Abraham" only the Jews. "The circumcised" denotes a Jew, even though he is uncircumcised, while "uncircumcised" is applied to pagans, even if they are circumcised; in this connection several maxims of different tannaim are quoted to show the importance and significance of circumcision (§§ 5-11).
- Chapter 4: If one is prevented by vows from enjoying another's society, he may be instructed by the latter in the Midrash, halakhot, and aggadot, but not in the Scriptures, and he may also be treated by that person in illness (§§ 1-4); further regulations concerning one's relations with a person whose society he has vowed not to enjoy (§§ 5-8).
- Chapter 5: How persons who have a house, bath, or the like in common, but have vowed not to associate with one another, may make use of the public parks and the communal institutions; in this connection it is stated that it was customary to deed such parks and institutions to the nasi as his private property, so that no citizen could deprive another of them.

=== Vows About Food ===
- Chapter 6: What is forbidden to one who has vowed to refrain from boiled, roasted, salted, or preserved food (§§ 1-3); what is forbidden to one who has vowed to refrain from meat, fish, milk, wine, or other things (§§ 4-10).
- Chapter 7: Further details regarding what is understood by vegetables, grain, clothes, house, bed, or city, in connection with vows (§§ 1-5); whether one may enjoy a substitute for what he has vowed to deny himself (§§ 6-7); conditional vows of renunciation for a certain time (§§ 8-9).
- Chapter 8: Further details regarding vows of renunciation for a definite time, and ways of interpreting certain expressions in determining such a time (§§ 1-6); vows of renunciation which may be canceled without asking the opinion of a scholar (§ 7).
- Chapter 9: Remission of vows by a scholar, and circumstances to which the scholar may refer in order to find grounds for such a dispensation (§§ 1-9); the noble conduct of R. Ishmael on remitting a vow which had been made to the detriment of a girl, and how at his death the Jewish women sang a dirge beginning, "O daughters of Israel, weep for R. Ishmael" (§ 10).

=== Vows of a daughter ===
- Chapter 10: Regarding the annulment of a daughter's vows by her father, or of a wife's by her husband (§§ 1-3); the custom of the scholars of canceling the vows of their daughters or wives (§ 4); the time after which a husband may annul the vows of his wife; whether the yabam may cancel the vows of his sister-in-law (§§ 5-6); whether a husband may annul at the outset the future vows of his wife (§ 7); the aggravating or ameliorating consequences arising from the rule that the father or the husband may cancel a vow only on the day on which he learns of it (§ 8; compare Numbers 30:6,13).
- Chapter 11: Vows of a wife or a daughter which may be annulled (§§ 1-4); erroneous or partial annulment is invalid (§§ 5-6); interpretation and explanation of the passage Numbers 30:10 (§ 9); enumeration of the nine virgins whose vows may not be canceled (§ 10); the regulation laid down by the scholars which was intended to make it impossible for a wife to take such vows as would force her husband to seek a divorce, as was customary in ancient times (§ 11).

== Gemara ==
The Tosefta to this tractate has only seven chapters; it contains various details which serve to explain the Mishnah. Thus, Tosefta 1 elucidates the law in Mishnah 1:1 referring to the vows of the pious.

Both Gemaras discuss and explain the several mishnayot, and both, especially the Babylonian Talmud, contain numerous maxims, statements, stories, and legends. The following interesting sayings from the Babylonian Gemara may be quoted:

- "A modest man will not easily commit sin"
- "The ancestors of the impudent never stood on Mount Sinai" (20a)
- "The irascible suffer the most diverse pains of hell" (22a)
- "If the people of Israel had not sinned, they would have had only the Pentateuch and the Book of Joshua" (22b)
- "Only the man devoid of understanding is poor; for a proverb of the Land of Israel says, 'He who has understanding has all things; but he who has no understanding has nothing'" (41a)
- "Work is great: it honors the workman" (49b)
- "Whoever exalts himself will be brought low by God" (55a)
- "One should not study in order to be called 'scholar' or 'master,' but out of love for the Law; for then fame and recognition will come in due course" (62a)
- "Take care of the children of the poor, who often become scholars"
- "Why have scholars very often no learned children? In order that science may not be thought transmissible by inheritance and that scholars may not pride themselves on an aristocracy of mind" (81a).

Especially noteworthy are the Masoretic remarks on the division into verses, and on Qere and Ketiv, which do not entirely agree with the present Masorah (37b-38a).

The passage in the Jerusalem Talmud, 3:2, is also of interest, since in it the various conflicting statements and regulations found in the Torah, such as Leviticus 18:16 and Deuteronomy 25:5 et seq., are collated, and it is explained that these apparently contradictory verses were pronounced together; Deuteronomy 25:5 is, therefore, only an exception to, but does not nullify, the prohibition in Leviticus 18:16.

The Jerusalem Talmud is also noteworthy for its account of the letters which Judah haNasi addressed to R. Joshua's nephew Hananiah, who would not submit to the nasi (6:8).
