= Uktzim =

Last Masekhet of the Order of Tohorot in the Mishnah

Uktzim (Hebrew: עוּקְצִים; ʿUqṣim, "Stems") is the last masekhet of the order of Tohorot in the Mishnah. It is the last tractate in the Mishnah. It consists of three chapters. Uktzim describes the various forms of tumah having to do with the stalks of fruits and vegetables.

There is no Gemara for Uktzim in either the Babylonian or Jerusalem Talmud. There is, however, a Tosefta for this tractate.

This tractate features the teaching of the Amora rabbi Joshua ben Levi, which is peculiar since Mishnayot are typically authored by Tannaim.
