= Gittin =

Tractate of the Mishnah and the Talmud

Tractate of the Talmud
- English: Divorce document
- Seder: Nashim
- Number of mishnahs: 57
- Chapters: 9
- Babylonian Talmud pages: 90
- Jerusalem Talmud pages: 54
- Tosefta chapters: 7

Gittin (Hebrew: גיטין) is a Mishnaic and Talmuddic masekhet tractate, and is part of the order of Nashim. The content of the tractate primarily deals with the legal provisions related to halakhic divorce, in particular, the laws relating to the Get (divorce document), although the tractate contains a number of other social provisions which are only vaguely related to that subject.

Broader discussions about when divorce is allowed or required are addressed in other tractates, particularly Ketubot.

The word get (Hebrew: גט) is thought to be an Akkadian word and generally refers to a written document.

== Legends of the Destruction ==
The Babylonian Talmud's version of the tractate contains a famous group of aggadot (non-legal rabbinic narratives), known as the "Legends of the Destruction" (Aggadot HaChurban). They recount several events surrounding the destruction of Jerusalem and the Second Temple, as well as other episodes from the Jewish–Roman wars.

One such example is the story of Kamtza and Bar Kamtza, which appears in Gittin 55b-56a. A man holding a banquet tells his servant to invite his friend Kamtza, but the servant mistakenly brings Bar Kamtza, the host's enemy. When the host finds Bar Kamtza among the guests, he has him ejected despite offers to pay for his place, and the rabbis present do nothing to intervene. Humiliated, Bar Kamtza informs against the Jews to the Romans, setting in motion a chain of events that leads to the war and the destruction of the Temple.

Also included in Gittin is a story of how the sage Yohanan ben Zakkai escaped Jerusalem in a coffin during the Roman siege. Predicting that Vespasian would become emperor, he obtained permission to establish a rabbinic center at Yavneh, which became a key center for the reconstitution of Judaism after the destruction. The story is also attested, with variations, in four other places in rabbinic literature.

== See also ==
- Get (divorce document)
- Lamentations Rabbah
