= Kinnim =

Tractate of the Talmud and the Mishnah

Kinnim (Hebrew: קינים) is a tractate in the order of Kodshim in the Mishna. The name, meaning "nests", refers to the tractate's subject matter of errors in bird-offerings. It is the last tractate in the order, because of its shortness (3 chapters) and because it deals with a very rare and unusual area of Jewish law.

The premise of the tractate is the obligatory bird-offering that has to be brought by certain people (for instance Nazirites at the completion of their vow and women after childbirth). The offering consists of a pair of birds, one for a sin-offering and the other for a peace-offering. A common practice was to purchase a cage with two birds, without designating which one was for which type of sacrifice. The Kohen would then allocate a sacrifice to a bird. However, the complication is that a cage (consisting of a pair of birds) cannot have both birds offered as one type of sacrifice. The result is that if birds become mixed up (whether completely or a number of birds flies from one group to another), certain birds are disqualified from being offered. It is the laws of these complications that form the subject of tractate Kinnim.

The tractate consists of three chapters:

- Chapter 1 deals largely with cases where birds flew into a designated group or where different groups of birds became totally mixed up.
- Chapter 2 considers the group from which a bird flew away, as well as multiple mixups
- Chapter 3 considers which sacrifices are counted if the Kohen did offer certain birds, without consulting the laws of chapters 1 and 2.

There is no Gemara on Kinnim in either the Talmud Bavli or the Talmud Yerushalmi. However, the Mishnayot of the tractate are included in the Daf Yomi cycle, and are printed in the standard editions of the Talmud. A traditional explanation for this has been that the addition of the tractate enabled all the tractates of Kodshim to be studied in the Daf Yomi cycle. In the standard edition, Kinnim is located in a volume which contains Meilah, Kinnim, Tamid and Midot. It occupies folios 22a-25a.

Kinnim is considered to be one of the most difficult tractates in the whole Talmud, largely because the mishnayot involve rather elaborate counting methods and practices. These resemble certain forms of counting found in discrete mathematics and, appropriately, make use of the pigeonhole principle. Furthermore, the form of expression in Kinnim is particularly terse, even for the Mishna. This has resulted in a number of commentaries, many of them having very different explanations of the whole tractate. However, it is only the last few mishnayot of the last chapter that have caused the most difficulties.
