= Mikva'ot =

Tractate of the Talmud

Tractate Miqwaʾoth (Hebrew: מקואות, lit. "Pools of Water"; in Talmudic Hebrew: Miqwaʾoth) is a section of the Mishna discussing the laws pertaining to the building and maintenance of a mikvah, a Jewish ritual bath. Like most of Seder Tohorot, Mikva'ot is present only in its mishnaic form and has no accompanying gemara in either the Babylonian or Jerusalem Talmud. It contains 10 chapters, with 83 paragraphs total.
