= Tohorot (tractate) =

Tractate of the Mishnah and the Babylonian Talmud

Tohorot (Hebrew: טָהֳרוֹת, literally "Purities") is a tractate in the Mishnah and Tosefta, treating especially of the lesser degrees of uncleanness the effects of which last until sunset only. In most editions of the Mishnah it is the fifth tractate in the order Tohorot. It is divided into ten chapters, comprising ninety-six paragraphs in all.

== Contents ==
- Chapter 1: The thirteen regulations concerning the nebelah of a bird, i.e., a fowl not ritually slaughtered; what quantity of such fowl causes uncleanness as nebelah, and what quantity uncleanness merely as other unclean foods; which parts are not included to make up the minimum required quantity; from which moment a head of cattle not ritually slaughtered acquires a lesser degree of uncleanness, i.e., that of ordinary foods, and when the higher degree of impurity, that of the nebelah; which parts are included in order to make up the minimum quantity for the lesser degree, but not for the higher degree (§§ 1-4); the mixing of different unclean foods to make up the required quantity—the size of an egg; cases in which, when the parts possess different degrees of impurity, the entire quantity becomes unclean either in the lesser or in the higher degree (§§ 5-6); parts of a mass of dough or a loaf of bread connected with or touching each other; how the uncleanness of one part affects the others (§§ 7-9).
- Chapter 2: How foods become impure when touched by an unclean person (§ 1); how a person becomes unclean through partaking of impure food (§ 2); difference between foods not sanctified, those constituting "terumah", and other sanctified foods, as regards their becoming unclean in the various degrees (§§ 3-8).
- Chapter 3: Impurity of beverages when in a liquid state, and when they have solidified; which drinks acquire the same degree of uncleanness in the liquid as in the solid state (§§ 1-3); how unclean foods become clean by a change of the prescribed quantity (§ 4); the degree of uncleanness of a thing is judged from the condition in which it is found (§ 5); doubtful cases of uncleanness, when it is not known whether the unclean parts have been touched by the person in question; the difference between reasoning and unreasoning beings in such cases; cases in which it is doubtful whether an animal has transferred impurity from unclean drinks to foods (§§ 6-8).
- Chapter 4: Doubtful cases of impurity (§§ 1-4); six cases in which terumah is burned because of suspected impurity (§§ 5-6); doubtful cases of impurity in which the sages declared the object to be clean; other doubtful cases in which the sages declared the object to be permissible (§§ 7-12).
- Chapter 5: Regulations concerning various cases of doubtful impurity.
- Chapter 6: Difference between private domain ("reshut ha-yaḥid") and public domain ("reshut harabbim") with reference to cases of doubtful impurity: in the former in all doubtful cases objects are to be declared unclean; in the latter, clean (§§ 1-5); different localities which are considered private domain with reference to the Sabbath, but public domain with regard to cases of doubtful impurity (§§ 6-10).
- Chapter 7: Various cases in which a thing is rendered unclean by being touched by a person ignorant of the law ("am ha-aretz"): as such a person does not observe the laws of cleanliness, his touch is necessarily unclean. Cases in which one must suspect an am ha-aretz of having touched foods and drinks, although he, personally, may have had nothing to do with them. If, for example, the wife of an am ha-aretz is seen to attend to the fire in a stove on which a pot containing terumah is standing, it must be assumed that she, although attending to the fire only, has touched the food also; women being generally curious to find out what their neighbors are cooking, she would most likely remove the cover of the pot in order to discover the contents.
- Chapter 8: Further regulations concerning precautions to be taken by one conversant with the Law ("chaber") in order to protect himself against uncleanness caused by the touch of an am ha-aretz (§§ 1-5); what is to be considered fit for human food, thus forming a basis for the regulations concerning the impurity of foods (§ 6); further regulations concerning the impurity of beverages (§§ 7-9).
- Chapters 9-10: Concerning olives and the pressing of oil; how they can be rendered unclean. Other regulations concerning cleanness and uncleanness, with special reference to wine-presses.

== Tosefta and Gemara ==
The Tosefta to this tractate is divided into eleven chapters, and contains many passages elucidating the Mishnaic tractate.

There is no Gemara for Tohorot in either the Babylonian Talmud or Jerusalem Talmud.
