= Orlah (tractate) =

Section of the Talmud in Judaism

Tractate of the Talmud
- English: First fruit
- Seder: Zeraim
- Number of mishnahs: 35
- Chapters: 3
- Babylonian Talmud pages: -
- Jerusalem Talmud pages: 20
- Tosefta chapters: 1

Orlah (Hebrew: עׇרְלָה, lit. "Blockage of Trees") is the tenth tractate of Seder Zeraim ("Order of Seeds") of the Mishnah and of the Talmud. It discusses the law of Leviticus 19:23 pertaining to any fruit bearing tree, whose fruits cannot be eaten during the first three years the tree produces fruit. The tractate generalizes this passage to discuss the broader topic of forbidden usufruct.

This law applies everywhere and for all time in Jewish communities and for any fruit bearing tree owned by a Jew. Then it discusses the laws of "Neta Revai", by which produce of the fourth year is to be treated like "Maaser Sheni".
