= Mo'ed Katan =

Tractate of the Mishnah and Talmud

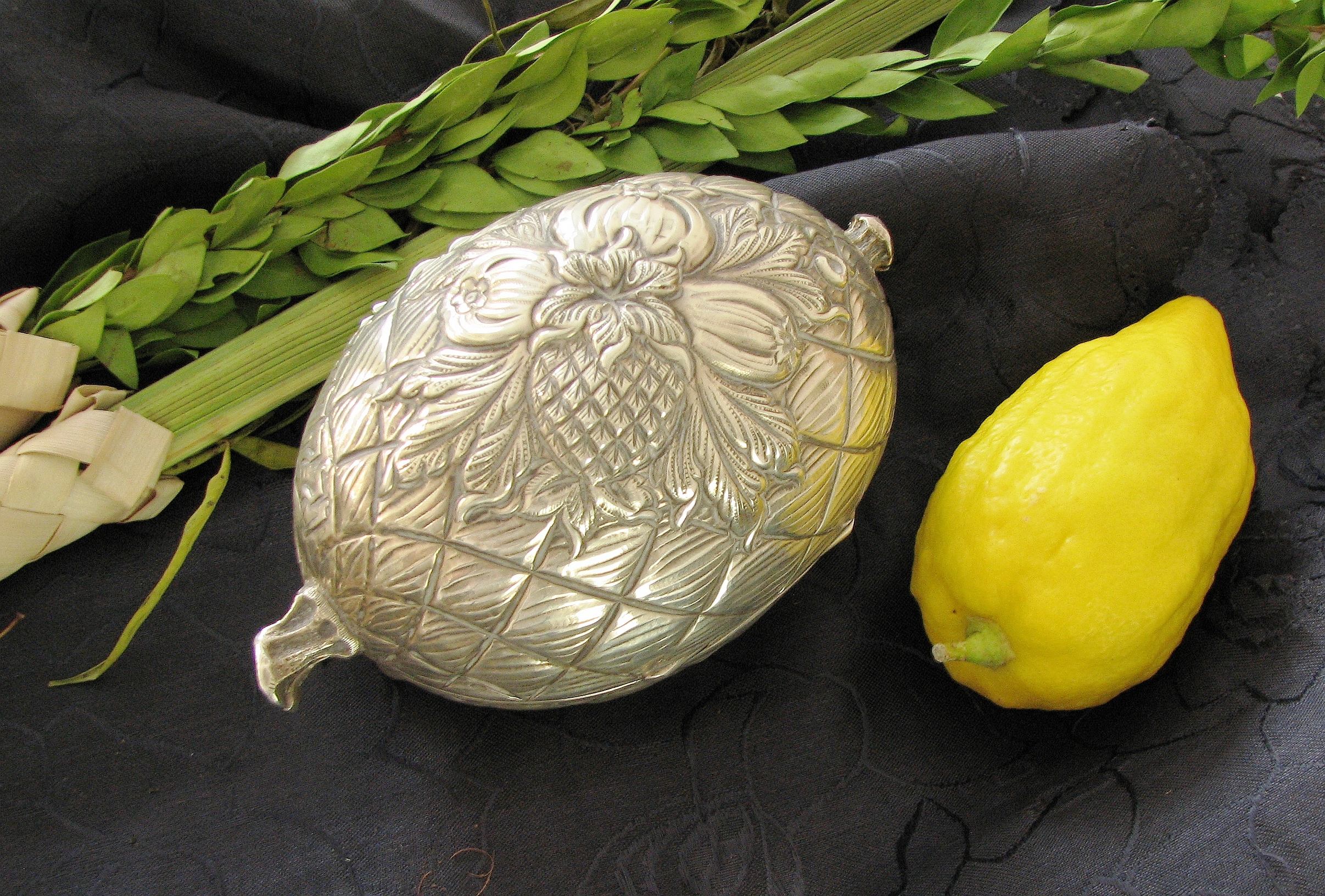
- The four species, waved on every day of Sukkot

Tractate of the Talmud
- Seder: Moed
- Number of mishnahs: 24
- Chapters: 3
- Babylonian Talmud pages: 29
- Jerusalem Talmud pages: 19
- Tosefta chapters: 2

Mo'ed Katan or Mo'ed Qatan (Hebrew: מוֹעֵד קָטָן, lit. 'small festival') is the eleventh tractate of Seder Moed of the Mishnah and the Talmud. It discusses the Halakha governing the days between the first and last days of Passover and Sukkot (since both festivals last a week), known as Chol HaMoed (חוֹל הַמּוֹעֵד, 'weekday [of] the festival'). The tractate also covers the laws of aveilut (אֲבֵלוּת, 'mourning'). It has only three chapters and includes Gemara from both the Babylonian and Jerusalem Talmuds.

== Summary ==
In the Babylonian Talmud:

- Chapters 1 and 2 deal with Chol HaMoed.
- Chapter 3 deals primarily with the laws of mourning and rabbinical censure (חֵרֶם, ḥērem, 'excommunication'), and gives accounts of the deaths of some of the Amoraim, including Rav Huna.

== Permitted Activities on Chol HaMoed ==
The Mishnah Berurah by Rabbi Yisrael Meir Kagan summarizes the important principles that emerged from Mo'ed Katan. In Mishnah Berurah 530:1, he lists the activities permitted on Chol HaMoed:

- Davar Ha'Aved (דָּבָר הָאָבֵד, 'A thing that is lost')—One may do work in order to avoid a loss (i.e., if the work is left to be done after Chol HaMoed, a loss will result);
- Tzarchei Moed—Even work that requires skill may be done if it is necessary for the purpose of eating on the festival. For other activities, only work that does not require skill may be done (if it is needed for Chol HaMoed);
- Bishvil Poel She'Ayn Lo Ma Yochal—If a person cannot afford to eat, it is permitted for them to work;
- Tzarchei Rabbim—Activities done for the benefit of the public may be done during Chol HaMoed;
- Ma'aseh Hedyot—Unskilled work.
