= Nashim =

Third Order of the Mishnah and Talmud

Nashim (Hebrew: נשים "Women" or "Wives") is the third order of the Mishnah (also of the Tosefta and Talmud), containing family law. Of the six orders of the Mishnah, it is the shortest.

Nashim consists of seven tractates:

1. Yevamot (יבמות "Sisters-in-Law") deals with the Jewish law of yibbum (levirate marriage) (Deut. 25:5–10) and other topics such as the status of minors. It consists of 16 chapters.
2. Ketubot (כתובות, "Prenuptial agreements") deals with the ketubah (Judaism's prenuptial agreement), as well as topics such as virginity, and the obligations of a couple towards each other. It consists of 13 chapters.
3. Nedarim (נדרים, "Vows") deals with various types of vows often known as nedarim and their legal consequences. It consists of 11 chapters.
4. Nazir (נזיר "One who abstains") deals with the details of the Nazirite vow and being a Nazirite (Num 6). It consists of 9 chapters.
5. Sotah (סוטה "Wayward wife") deals with the ritual of the sotah, the woman suspected of adultery (Num 5) as well as other rituals involving a spoken formula (such as breaking the heifer's neck, the King's Septennial public Torah reading, the Blessings and Curses of Mount Gerizim and Mount Ebal, etc...). It consists of nine chapters.
6. Gittin: (גיטין "Documents") deals with the concepts of divorces and other documents. It consists of 9 chapters.
7. Kiddushin: (קידושין "Betrothal") deals with the initial stage of marriage – betrothal, as well as the laws of Jewish lineages. It consists of 4 chapters.

== Order of tractates ==
The traditional reasoning for the order of tractates according to Maimonides is as follows:

- Yevamot is first because unlike the others, it is largely concerned with a compulsory commandment (levirate marriage) as opposed to a voluntary one.
- Ketubot follows as it signifies the beginning of married life.
- Nedarim follows because once a man is married to a woman, he has the legal right (under certain conditions) to annul her vows.
- Nazir, dealing with a special type of vow is a continuation on the subject of vows.
- The penultimate sections deal with the end of a marriage with Sotah which is concerned with infidelity and Gittin which is about actual divorce (Rambam's order swaps these two).
- Kiddushin is at the end because it follows the Scriptural order that once a woman is divorced, she can get betrothed to any man, this subsequent betrothal symbolised by the placement of Kiddushin.

Both the Babylonian and Jerusalem Talmuds have a Gemara on each of the tractates in the order.
