= Bekhorot =

Tractate of the Talmud

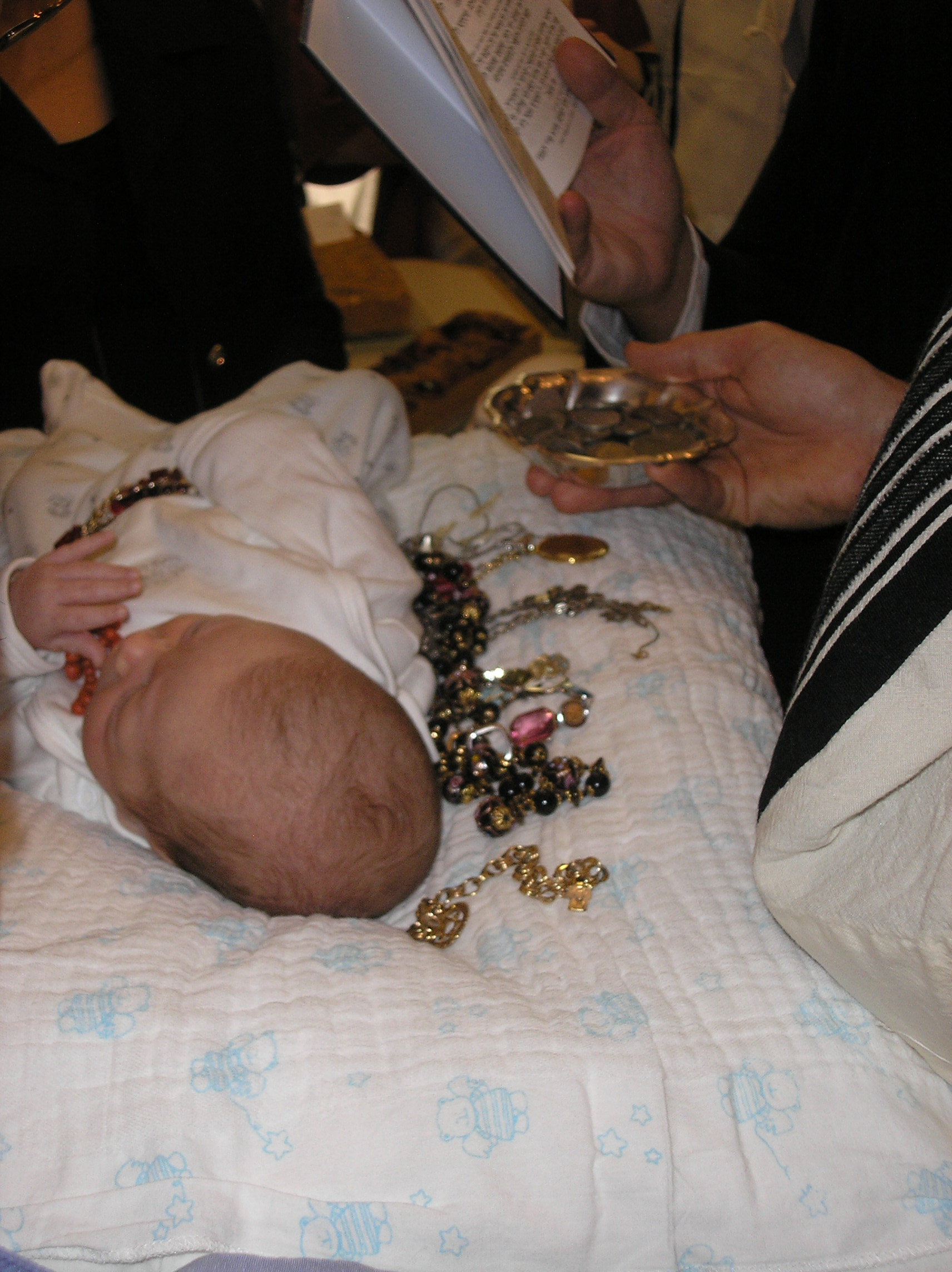
Pidyon haben

Bekorot (Hebrew: בכורות, "First-borns") is the name of a tractate of the Mishnah and Talmud which discusses the laws of first-born animals and humans. It is one of the tractates forming Seder Kodashim (Hebrew סדר קודשים, "Order of Holy Things").

The primary focus of the tractate relates to the ritual sacrifice (or slaughter) of first-born animals. Priests were required to inspect the first-born for blemishes prior to consecration. These blemishes are enumerated in both the Mishnah and Tosefta. An exemption is made for the first-born son, who is "redeemed" in the Pidyon haben ceremony.

== Mishna ==
The tractate contains nine chapters:

- Chapter 1 on the first-born donkey (Petter Chamor)
- Chapters 2-6 on the first-born of kosher cattle (calf, lamb, or kid): cases of exemption through partnership with a non-Jew (chapter 2); cases of doubt whether an animal is first-born or not (3); on first-born cattle having a blemish (4); on cases of blemishes willfully caused by the owner (5); a list of blemishes (6).
- Chapter 7 on the first-born son and laws of his redemption (Pidyon haben).
- Chapter 8 on blemishes that disqualify a priest for the sacrificial service
- Chapter 9 on laws concerning the animal tithe—a subject which has many things in common with the "first-born" (see Zevahim 5:8).

Besides chapters 7 and 9, there are a few digressions in the tractate. 1:7 speaks of the option between redeeming the first-born donkey and killing it, and recommends the former course; a few parallels are then introduced of option between two courses, of which one is recommended. The examination of the blemishes of the first-born animal had to be done gratis (4:5,6), but an exception is made in favor of a professional veterinary surgeon, such as Ila (or Ayla; in Tosefta Bekhorot 4:11, Amlah). In the same chapter another veterinary authority is named: Theodos the physician (4:4).

To take payment for giving a decision in religious matters was considered unlawful and it rendered the decision invalid (4:6). When unqualified persons caused loss through their decision, they had to compensate for the loss; not so in the case of qualified persons (4:4). Transfer of property is generally reversed in the Jubilee year; but what the first-born obtains by his birthright remains his forever. Parallel cases are given in 8:10.

== Tosefta ==
In the Tosefta the treatise Bekorot has likewise the fourth place, and is divided into seven chapters. Chapter 1 corresponds to the first chapter of the Mishnah; chapter 2 to 2-3; chapter 3 to 4-5; chapter 4 to 6; chapter 5 to 7; chapter 6 to 8; chapter 7 to 9. The Tosefta differs greatly from the Mishnah in the enumeration of the blemishes and in their names. In addition to names of blemishes, the Tosefta expands on different scenarios in which a Kohen may find himself when determining the status of a first-born, for example when a creature gives birth to an animal resembling another species.

== Talmud ==
The Jerusalem Talmud does not contain a tractate Bekhorot. The Babylonian Talmud contains such a tractate, where it has the third place in the Seder.

In addition to the common theme of purity, the Babylonian Talmud expands on the exemption of the first-born Levite, or Kohen. The child of a Levite mother, or Kohenim, regardless whether or not the father is a Levite or Israelite, is automatically exempt from the "toll". This exemption is due to the notion that first-born males are already born in the service of God thus redemption is not needed.

== See also ==
- Firstborn (Judaism)
