= Nazir (Talmud) =

Hebrew treatise of the Mishnah and the Tosefta and in both Talmuds

Tractate of the Talmud
- English: Nazirite
- Seder: Nashim
- Number of mishnahs: 60
- Chapters: 9
- Babylonian Talmud pages: 66
- Jerusalem Talmud pages: 47
- Tosefta chapters: 6

Nazir (Hebrew: נזיר) is a treatise of the Mishnah and the Tosefta and in both Talmuds, devoted chiefly to a discussion of the laws of the Nazirite laid down in Numbers 6:1-21. In the Tosefta its title is Nezirut ("Nazariteness"). In most of the editions of the Mishnah, this treatise is the fourth in the order Nashim, and it is divided into 9 chapters, containing 48 paragraphs in all.

== Summary of the Mishnayot ==
=== The different kinds of vows ===
Chapter 1: The different kinds of vows which involve compulsory Nazariteship (§§ 1-2); Nazariteship for life, Samson's Nazariteship (compare Judges 12:4 et seq.), and the difference between these two kinds (§ 2); Nazariteship is calculated by days only, not by hours, and generally lasts thirty days if no definite period is given (§ 3); different expressions which make a sort of lifelong Nazariteship compulsory, although the hair may be cut once in thirty days (§ 4); peculiar indefinite expressions used in connection with the vow (§§ 5-7).

Chapter 2: Whether vows which are expressed in a peculiar, incorrect manner are binding (§§ 1-2); cases in which a clearly expressed vow of Nazariteship is not binding (§ 3); vows made under conditions incompatible with Nazariteship (§ 4); combination of two Nazariteships, or of one with the vow to bring an additional sacrifice for a Nazarite; conditional vows (§§ 5-9).

Chapter 3: When a Nazarite may cut his hair in case he has vowed only one term of Nazariteship, or when he has vowed two successive terms (§§ 1-2); whether a Nazarite who has become unclean on the last day of his term must recommence his Nazariteship, and the cases in which he must do so (§§ 3-4); the case of one who vows Nazariteship while in a burial-place (§ 5); Nazariteship may be observed only in the Holy Land; Helena, Queen of Adiabene, once vowed Nazariteship for seven years, and fulfilled her vow; but when she went to the land of Israel at the end of the seventh year, the Bet Hillel decided that she must observe her vow for another period of seven years, since the time which she had spent outside of the land of Israel could not be taken into account (§ 6).

=== Wards and minors ===
Chapter 4: Cases in which a person utters a vow of Nazariteship and those present say, "We too"; dispensation from such vows; concerning the nullification of a wife's vows of Nazariteship by her husband (§§ 1-5); the father may make a vow of Nazariteship for his minor son, but not the mother; and in like manner the son, but not the daughter, may, in certain cases and in certain respects, succeed to the father's term of Nazariteship (§§ 6-7).

Chapter 5: Cases in which a person dedicates or vows something by mistake; Nazarites who had made their vows before the destruction of the Temple, and, on coming to Jerusalem to offer their sacrifices, had learned that the Temple had been destroyed (§ 4); conditional Nazaritic vows (§§ 5-7).

=== Sacrifices of Nazarites ===
Chapter 6: Things forbidden to the Nazarite; enumeration of the different things coming from the vine; cases in which a Nazarite is guilty of trespassing against the interdiction prohibiting the drinking of wine (§§ 1-2); cases in which he is guilty of trespassing against that concerning the cutting of his hair (§ 3); in what respects the interdiction against defilement by a corpse is more rigorous than those against drinking wine and cutting the hair, and in what respects the last two interdictions are more rigorous than the first (§ 5); sacrifices and cutting of the hair if the Nazarite has become unclean (§ 6); sacrifices and cutting of the hair when the Nazariteship is fulfilled; burning of the cut hair under the pot in which the flesh of the sacrifice is cooked; other regulations regarding the sacrifices by Nazarites (§§ 7-11).

Chapter 7: The Nazarite and the Kohen Gadol may not defile themselves through contact with corpses even in the case of the death of a near relative; discussion of the question whether the Nazarite or the high priest defiles himself if both together find a corpse which must be buried and no one else is there to do it (§ 1); things which defile the Nazarite, and other regulations regarding the uncleanness of a person entering the Temple (§§ 2-3).

Chapter 8: Regulations in cases where it is doubtful whether the Nazarite has become unclean.

Chapter 9: Unlike slaves and women, "Kutim" (Samaritans) may not make a Nazaritic vow; in what respects Nazaritic vows of women are more rigorous than those of slaves, and vice versa (§ 1); further details regarding the defilement of a Nazarite; the examination of burial-places, and, in connection therewith, rules for the examination of a person suffering from discharges or tzaraath (§§ 2-4); discussion of the question whether Samuel was a Nazarite (§ 5).

== Tosefta ==
The Tosefta to this treatise is divided into six chapters. Noteworthy is the story it narrates of the high priest Simon the Just, who never partook of the sacrifice offered by a Nazarite, with the exception of that offered by a handsome youth from the south, since in this case he could assume that the young man had made his vow with the best intentions and acceptably to God. When Simon asked why he had decided to clip his hair, the youth replied that on beholding his image in a pool he had become vain of his own beauty, and had therefore taken the Nazaritic vow to avoid all temptations (4:7).

== Talmud ==
The Babylonian Gemara, whose introductory passage explains, by a reference to the Bible why the treatise Nazir belongs to the order Nashim, contains also many interesting teachings, including the following:

- "The forty years (Samuel II 15:7) are reckoned from the time when the Israelites first asked for a king" (5a)
- "The Nazarite has sinned (Numbers 6:11) by denying himself wine; and if one who denies himself wine, which is not absolutely necessary, is deemed a sinner, one who denies himself other things which are needful for the sustenance of life is a much greater sinner" (19a)
- "An infringement of the Law with good intentions is better than its fulfillment without good intentions. Still one must study the Torah and observe its commandments, even though he is not in the proper mood, since he will gradually acquire thereby a sympathetic frame of mind" (23b).

== See also ==
- Nazirite
