= Tohorot =

Sixth Order of the Mishnah and Talmud

Tohorot (Hebrew: טָהֳרוֹת, lit. 'Purities') is the sixth and last order of the Mishnah (also of the Tosefta and Talmud). This order deals with the clean/unclean distinction and family purity. This is the longest of the orders in the Mishnah. There are 12 tractates:

1. Keilim: (כלים "Vessels"); deals with a large array of various utensils and how they fare in terms of purity. 30 chapters, the longest in the Mishnah.
2. Oholot: (אוהלות "Tents"); deals with the uncleanness from a corpse and its peculiar property of defiling people or objects either by the latter "tenting" over the corpse, or by the corpse "tenting" over them, or by the presence of both corpse and person or object under the same roof or tent.
3. Nega'im: (נגעים "Plagues"); deals with the laws of the tzaraath.
4. Parah: (פרה "Cow"); deals largely with the laws of the Red Heifer (Para Adumah).
5. Tohorot: (טהרות "Purities"); deals with miscellaneous laws of purity, especially the actual mechanics of contracting impurity and the laws of the impurity of food.
6. Mikva'ot: (מקואות "Ritual Baths"); deals with the laws of the mikveh.
7. Niddah: (נידה "Separation"); deals with the Niddah, a woman either during her menstrual cycle or shortly after having given birth.
8. Makhshirin: (מכשירין "Preliminary acts of preparation"), the liquids that make food susceptible to tumah (ritual impurity).
9. Zavim: (זבים "Flows"); deals with the laws of a person who has had abnormal genital discharge.
10. Tevul Yom: (טבול יום "Immersed [on that] day") deals with a special kind of impurity where the person immerses in a mikveh but is still unclean for the rest of the day.
11. Yadayim: (ידיים "Hands"); deals with a Rabbinic impurity related to the hands.
12. Uktzim: (עוקצים "Stalks"); deals with the impurity of the stalks of fruit.

== Order of tractates ==
According to Maimonides, the traditional reasoning for the order of the tractates is as follows:

- Kelim is first as it introduces the levels of impurity, and dictates to which object the various impurities apply at all.
- Oholot follows because it outlines the most serious type of impurity.
- Negaim follows because it is next in severity and because, like a corpse, a metzorah transmits tent-impurity. Parah follows as it outlines the purification for the severe impurities already dealt with.
- The next stage is lesser impurities (Tohorot) and their method of purification which is immersion (Mikvaot).
- Niddah follows as it is also a lesser impurity but it has the extra feature of applying to only a portion of people (i.e. to women).
- Makshirin, Zavim and Tevul Tom follow Niddah based on Scriptural order.
- The next stage down is Yadaim, concerning impurities that are Rabbinic only.
- Uktzin is last as it is restricted and has no Scriptural source, the laws being derived from the reasoning of the Sages.

The Jewish Encyclopedia, on the other hand, observed that the tractates are arranged in order of decreasing length.

There is a Babylonian Gemara only on Niddah. This is because most of the other laws of purity do not apply when the Temple in Jerusalem is not in existence. The Jerusalem Talmud only covers four chapters of Niddah.

== See also ==
- Talmud
- Mishnah
- Gemara
