= Keilim =

Tractate of the Talmud

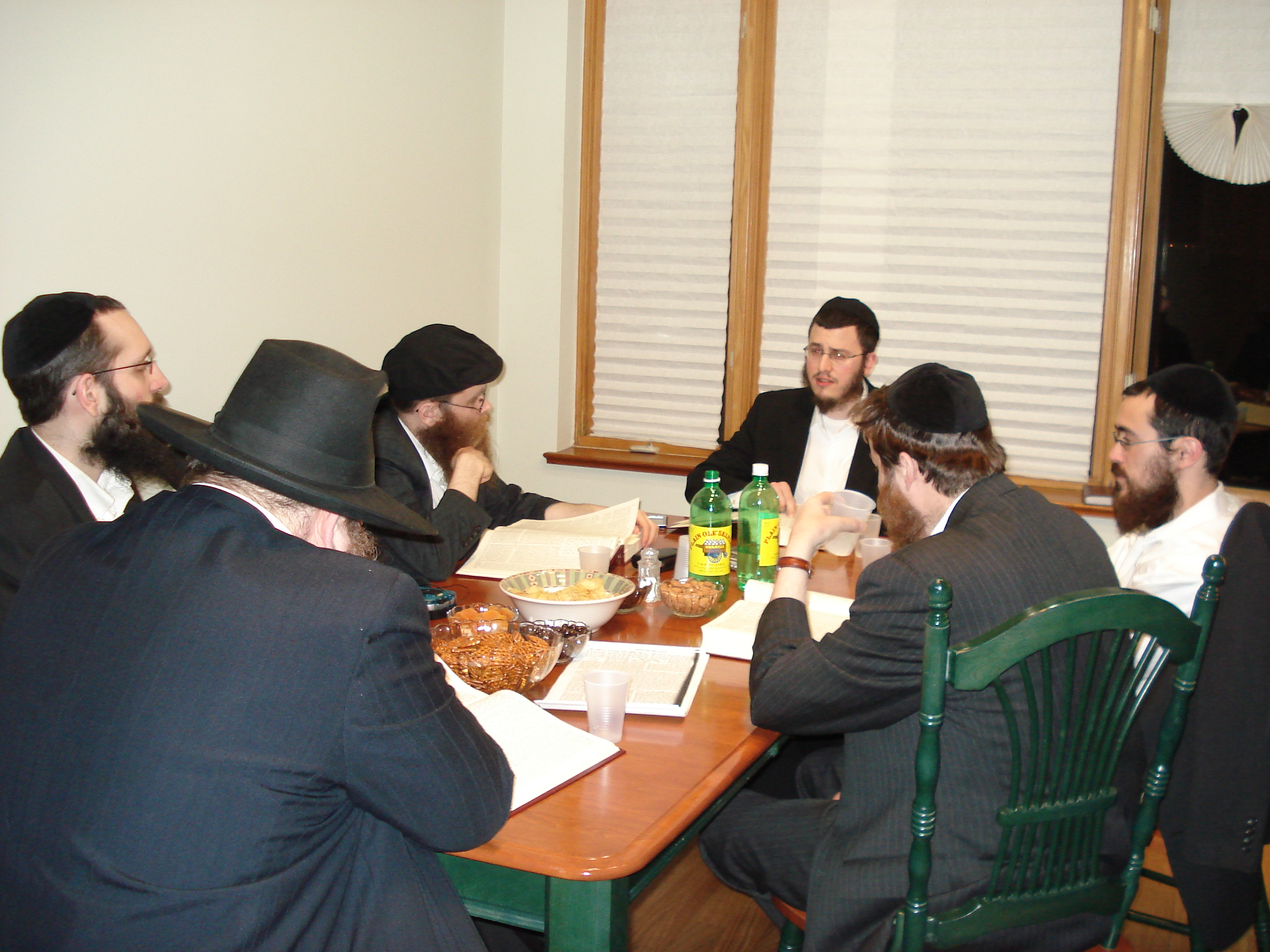
A group of Kohanim studying the Mishnayot laws of Keilim in anticipation of the rebuilding of the Temple in Jerusalem

Keilim or Kelim (Hebrew: כֵּלִים, literally "Vessels") is the first tractate in the Order of Tohorot in the Mishnah. It contains thirty chapters, making it the longest tractate in the Mishnah. The Tosefta on Keilim consists of twenty-five chapters, divided into Bava Kama ("First Gate"), Bava Metzia ("Middle Gate"), and Bava Batra ("Final Gate") of Keilim. The tractate discusses the laws of ritual purity and impurity pertaining to all types of vessels.

- Chapter 1 clarifies the ranking of ritual impurities
- Chapters 2–10 discuss earthenware vessels (clay ovens, etc.)
- Chapters 11–14 discuss metal vessels
- Chapters 15–19 discuss vessels made of wood, leather, and bone
- Chapters 20–25 discuss laws of purity and impurity for vessels
- Chapters 26–28 discuss laws pertaining to leather and clothing
- Chapter 29 discusses the seams of clothing and vessels
- Chapter 30 discusses glass vessels.

There is no Gemara for Keilim in either the Babylonian or Jerusalem Talmud.

ArtScroll Mishnah Series has published a two-volume series explaining all of Mishnayot Keilim in English with many full-color illustrations.
