= Parah =

Tractate of the Talmud

Parah (Hebrew: פָּרָה) is the name of a treatise in the Mishnah and the Tosefta, included in the order Tohorot. The Pentateuchal law (Num. 19) decrees that a red heifer, "wherein is no blemish, and upon which never came yoke," shall be burned and her ashes mixed with spring water, that the compound so obtained may be used to sprinkle and cleanse every one who becomes unclean. The burning of the heifer and the preparation of the ashes, as well as the fetching of the water and its mixture for sprinkling, were attended by strict ceremonies. The treatise Parah contains a detailed description of these ceremonies, as well as various regulations concerning the purity of the water for sprinkling and its different effects.

In most editions the treatise is the fourth in the mishnaic order Tohorot, and is divided into twelve chapters, containing ninety-six paragraphs in all.

== Contents ==
- Chapter 1: Contents. Age of the red heifer and of the young heifer (comp. Deut. 21:3); explanation of the word "shelashit" as three-year-old, and of "reba'i" as four-year-old (§ 1); age of the different sacrificial animals, and the different names which some of them bear according to their ages (§§ 2–4).
- Chapter 2: Whether the red heifer may be purchased from a non-Jew (§ 1); cases in which her horns and hoofs are black (§ 2); the defects, and the burdens carried which make the red heifer unavailable (§§ 3–4); cases in which she becomes unsuitable on account of some white or black hairs (§ 5).
- Chapter 3: Preparation of the priest who is to burn the red heifer (§ 1); prevention of any possible defilement, by rearing in houses built over hollow rock; the children who fetch the water from Siloam (§§ 2–4); seven red heifers said to have been prepared in all: one by Moses, one by Ezra, and five in the time after Ezra (§ 5); a special passage was constructed for the priest and the red heifer from the Temple Mount to the Mount of Olives, where she was burned (§ 6); the elders of the people went ahead to the Mount of Olives, where a miḳweh was erected. There the priest was made ritually unclean, and was then obliged to immerse himself immediately, thus directly rebuking the Sadducees, who insisted that the priest who performed the ceremony should be absolutely pure, a state which he could attain only after sundown of the day on which he had taken the ritual bath (§ 7); further details regarding the functions of the elders and the slaughtering and burning of the heifer (§§ 8–10); the ashes were divided into three parts: one part was kept in the "ḥel," the space between the wall of the Temple and the hall, and the second on the Mount of Olives, while the third was divided among the orders of priests (§ 11).
- Chapter 4: Circumstances which render the heifer unavailable (§§ 1–3); cases in which all who take part in the ceremony become ritually unclean; all preparations concerning the heifer must be made in the daytime (§ 4).
- Chapter 5: Vessels which are suitable for receiving the ashes and the water; persons entitled to throw the ashes into the water; regarding the gutter in the rock.
- Chapter 6: Things which render the ashes and the water unavailable.
- Chapter 7: Acts which, if performed between or during the drawing of the water and its admixture with the ashes, render these parts of the ceremony invalid.
- Chapter 8: Preservation of the water for sprinkling (§ 1); instances in which an unclean thing can not cause defilement to a human being, but a thing which has been made unclean by such an object can cause ritual impurity (§§ 2–7); different kinds of water, and which of them are suitable for the water for sprinkling. (§§ 8–11).
- Chapter 9: Causes which render the water for sprinkling unavailable (§§ 1–4); concerning water for sprinkling which has become unavailable (§ 5); the mixture of the ashes of the red heifer with ordinary ashes (§ 7); effects still exercised by water for sprinkling which has become unavailable (§§ 8–9).
- Chapter 10: How one who is pure in regard to the water for sprinkling may become defiled; how the water becomes unclean.
- Chapter 11: Further details regarding defilement of the water for sprinkling (§§ 1–3); difference in its effect upon those who require a ritual bath according to the Pentateuchal law, and those on whom it is obligatory according to a scribal regulation (§§ 4–5); the proper species of hyssop (comp. Num. 19:6), how many stalks of it must be taken, and how many stems there must be on each stalk (§§ 7–9).
- Chapter 12: Further details regarding the hyssop, the persons who may perform the act of sprinkling, and the cases in which the sprinkling is ineffective.

== Tosefta ==
The Tosefta to this treatise contains much to supplement and explain the Mishnah.
