= Makhshirin =

Makhshirin is the eighth tractate, in the Mishnah and Tosefta, of the sixth Talmudic order Tohorot ("Purifications"). This tractate contains six chapters, divided respectively into 6, 11, 8, 10, 11, and 8 sections, while the Tosefta has only three chapters and 31 sections. It treats of the effects of liquids in rendering foods with which they may come into contact susceptible, under certain conditions, of Levitical uncleanness.

There is no Gemara, Yerushalmi or Bavli, to this treatise.

== Background ==
The laws is based on the Scriptural provision, "If any water be put upon the seed, and any part of their carcass fall thereon, it shall be unclean" (Lev. 11:38; see 34 et seq.). From this the Rabbis deduce (1) that foods are not susceptible of uncleanness by contact with the carcass of a reptile unless the foods have first been moistened (see Hullin 36a); and (2) that as Scripture, in the passage just cited, uses the expression כי יתן, which, when vowelless, may be read either "ki yuttan" (= "if it be put") or "ki yitten" (= "if one will put"), and as "putting" is necessarily the result of intention, "being put" also must be accompanied by intention (see Bava Metzia 22b). Where this condition is absent the contact of liquid with foods will have no effect. Hence the general rule elaborated in the first chapter following.

== Mishnah ==
Chapter 1: All liquids (mashkin; see 6:4 et seq.), when originally desired (expected to be beneficial), though ultimately unwelcome, or when the reverse is the case (not desired originally, but ultimately acceptable), predispose loose fruit moistened by them to Levitical uncleanness. Thus if one shakes a tree to bring down some fruit, or a dead reptile, and at the same time some drops of water fall from the tree on fruit lying near by, the water does not come under the law of ki yuttan, or the fruit under liability to uncleanness by contact with a defiling object; but when one's intention is to shake off the rain-water or the dewdrops, the loose fruit moistened thereby becomes susceptible to uncleanness. Where water is used for other than its ordinary purposes, as where one submerges fruit or vegetables to secrete them from thieves, the effect is not to render the fruit liable to defilement. A precedent under this rule is cited from the history of the last days of Judea's struggle against the Romans, when some citizens of Jerusalem secured their fig-cakes from the sicarii by hiding them under water, the Rabbis deciding that, under the circumstances, the submersion did not predispose the food to uncleanness. Similarly, fruit that is floated down a river is not subject to the rule of ki yuttan.

Chapter 2: In doubtful cases, objects and conditions are classified by a majority rule. For example, the defiling effects of receptacles of waste water used in common by Jews and Gentiles will depend on the majority using them; if the majority are non-Jews the water will be considered Levitically unclean, but where the majority are Jews the water will be considered Levitically pure. Where these are equally divided the presumption of uncleanness will prevail. The majority rule is not limited to questions of clean and unclean; it serves as a criterion in other matters, ritual and even civil.

Chapters 3-6:3 continue the discussion of the main subject in connection with the Scriptural expression "ki yuttan."

Chapter 6:4-8 enumerates the mashkin which render loose fruit liable to Levitical uncleanness through contact with defiling objects. According to the Rabbis, the term "mashkin" covers seven kinds of liquid: dew, water, wine, oil, blood, milk, and honey (see Tosefta, Shabbat 8 [9] 24-28, where Scriptural phraseology is adduced to prove the connotation of "mashkeh"). "Water" includes discharges of the eye, ear, and other organs.
