= Oholot =

Tractate of the Talmud

ʾOholoth (אׇהֳלוֹת, literally "Tents") is the second tractate of the Order of Tohorot in the Mishnah. It consists of eighteen chapters, which discuss the ritual impurity of corpses, and the peculiar quality they have to make all objects in the same tent-like structure impure as well.

This tractate, along with Nega'im, was considered one of the most difficult tractates; according to a Jewish legend, King David is said to have asked of God that reading the Book of Psalms be considered the equivalent of studying the tractate of Negaim and Oholot.

There is no Gemara for Oholot in either the Babylonian or Jerusalem Talmud.

In the Tosefta and Jerusalem Talmud the name of this tractate is spelled Ahilot (אהילות, "coverings") rather than Oholot (אהלות, "tents"), as its subject is the transfer of tumah through other coverings as well as tents. Indeed, the proper plural of "tents" is oholim, not oholot.
