= Yevamot =

Tractate of the Talmud

Tractate of the Talmud
- Seder: Nashim
- Number of mishnahs: 123
- Chapters: 16
- Babylonian Talmud pages: 122
- Jerusalem Talmud pages: 85
- Tosefta chapters: 14

Yevamot (Hebrew: יבמות, "Brother's Widow", also pronounced Yevamos, or Yavmus) is a tractate of the Talmud composed in Babylon circa 450–550 CE, dealing with, among other concepts, the laws of Yibbum (ייבום, loosely translated in English as levirate marriage), and, briefly, with conversion to Judaism. This tractate is the first in the order of Nashim (נשים, "Women").

Yevamot, along with Eruvin and Niddah, is considered one of the three most difficult tractates in the Babylonian Talmud. A Hebrew mnemonic for the three is עני (ani, meaning "poverty").

== Contents ==
Yibbum is the Torah law (Deuteronomy 25:5–10) by which the brother of a man who died without children is allowed and expected to marry the widow. This law only applies to paternal brothers, i.e., brothers by the same father; whether they have the same mother or different mothers is irrelevant. The deceased's widow(s) is forbidden to marry anyone else while waiting for one of the brothers to marry her, or release to her by performing a ceremony known as Halizah. In any case where Yibbum applies, Halitsah may be performed as an alternative. There are numerous cases discussed in this tractate where Yibbum does not apply, and therefore Haliysah does not apply either. English translation for this type of union is “Levirate Marriage,” from the Latin “Levir,” which means brother in law.

== Chapter headings ==
1. Chamesh Esreh Nashim חמש עשרה נשים
2. Keytzad Eshet Achiv כיצד אשת אחיו
3. (Arba'ah Achim) (ארבעה אחים)
4. Hacholetz Livamto החולץ ליבמתו
5. Rabban Gamli'el רבן גמליאל
6. Habba Al Yevimto הבא על יבמתו
7. Almanah Lekhohen Gadol אלמנה לכהן גדול
8. He'arel הערל
9. Yesh Muttarot יש מותרות
10. (Ha'ishah Shehalakh Balah Limdinat Hayam) (האישה שהלך בעלה למדינת הים)
11. Nose'in Al Ha'anusah נושאין על האנוסה
12. Mitzvat Chalitzah מצות חליצה
13. Beit Shamay Omrim Eyn Mema'anin בית שמאי אומרים אין ממאנין
14. Cheresh Shennasa חרש שנשא
15. Ha'ishah Shehalekhah Hi האשה שהלכה היא | Ha'ishah ... Shalom האשה ... שלום
16. Ha'ishah Batra האשה בתרא | Ha'ishah Shehalekhah Balah Vetzaratah האשה שהלכה בעלה וצרתה
