= Tevul Yom =

Tevul Yom is a tractate in the Mishnah and Tosefta; in most editions of the Mishnah, it is tenth in the order Tohorot.

According to Leviticus 15:5 et seq., one who takes the prescribed ritual immersion remains impure until sunset. The degree of impurity in such a case is slight, and according to rabbinical interpretation, such a person renders neither the dough offering nor sanctified flesh is unclean, even before sunset; it is merely rendered unfit (pasul). He may touch profane or unsanctified things without consequence. This tractate precisely defines the degree of impurity attaching to such a person, and stipulates how far the purity of anything is affected by his touch.

== Contents ==
In the Mishnah, the tractate comprises four chapters, containing 26 paragraphs in all:

- Chapter 1: Laws concerning bread and other things which are of such a form that if a tevul yom or any other uncleanness touches part of them the whole is rendered impure.
- Chapter 2: Concerning liquids touched by a tevul yom; when such contact renders the whole unfit, and when it affects only the part touched.
- Chapter 3: Continuation of chapter 2: laws concerning liquids easily rendered impure.
- Chapter 4: Laws concerning utensils touched by a tevul yom; enumeration of halakhic rules which have undergone changes in the course of time; of the halakhic regulations which R. Joshua declared were introduced by the sages ("soferim"), and which he was unable to explain.

In the Tosefta, the tractate is divided into two chapters.
