= Zavim =

Zavim is the ninth tractate in the Mishnah and Tosefta of the sixth Talmudic order Tohorot. It deals with the laws of the zav and zavah, based on Leviticus 15.

== Contents ==
The treatise consists of five chapters, divided respectively into 6, 4, 3, 7, and 12 paragraphs, or mishnayot. It gives in detail all particulars of uncleanness and purification, specifies the degrees of the discharges which render an individual subject to the laws stated above, and mentions what persons are subject to those laws and in what way they cause vessels or other people to become unclean. The contents of the respective chapters may be summarized as follows:

- Chapter 1: In order to be liable for the full length of impurity, a zav must have his discharge three times, either all on one day or on two or three consecutive days; consideration of the length of the intervals between the discharges.
- Chapter 2: All are subject to the laws of Zavim, including proselytes, slaves, minors, deaf-mutes, and eunuchs; description of the different methods by which the zav is examined, and an explanation of the manner in which he makes people and things unclean by his touch.
- Chapters 3 and 4: Specification of the different ways in which a man or a woman suffering from a discharge makes unclean another person. For instance, if a zav and a clean person sit together in a small boat or ride together on a beast, even though their garments do not come in contact the clean person becomes unclean by the pressure; but, according to R. Judah, if both of them sit on a tottering bench, the clean person does not become unclean.
- Chapter 5: The ways in which a person becomes unclean by touching a zav, and also in which things become unclean through the touch of the zav and by touching other unclean things.
