= Shevu'ot =

Tractate of the Mishnah and the Talmud

Shevu'ot or Shevuot (Hebrew: שבועות, "Oaths") is a book of the Mishnah and Talmud. It is the sixth volume of the book of Nezikin. Shevu'ot deals primarily with the laws of oaths in halakha (Jewish law).

== Mishnah ==
The Mishnah to Shevu'ot contains eight chapters:

1. In connection with the statement that oaths may be divided into two classes, which are again subdivided into four, other actions and conditions are enumerated which are similarly divided; e.g., the perception of defilement, carrying from a private domain to the public domain on the Sabbath and vice versa, and the appearance of the different kinds of leprosy (§ 1); further details concerning the method of recognizing uncleanness; manner of effecting atonement, by various private or communal sacrifices, for offenses committed consciously or unconsciously in a state of uncleanness, or for other trespasses against the Law (§ § 2-7).
2. Further details relating to the perception of uncleanness; the statement that a person who enters the Temple in a condition of uncleanness must offer a sacrifice, is supplemented by one to the effect that all the apartments subsequently added to the Temple must be regarded in this respect as the Temple proper; in connection therewith the ceremonial accompanying the enlargement of the Temple and of the city is described.
3. On the four kinds of oaths, and the difference, of opinion between R. Ishmael and R. Akiba in regard to this subject (§§ 1-5); if a person swears to fulfil or to disregard a religious duty, he is not bound to offer a sacrifice in the case of not fulfilling his vow (§ 6); concerning a thoughtless vow ("shebu'at biṭṭuy") and a vain oath ("shebu'at shaw"), e.g., when a person affirms an absurd statement by an oath, as that a stone is gold, or that he saw a camel fly through the air (§§ 7-8); violation of an oath (§ 9); the punishment for the intentional violation of a thoughtless oath, and the sacrifice which must be offered in the case of an unintentional violation (§ 10); the punishment for transgressing a vain oath (§ 11).
4. Concerning the oath of the witness; if a person asks two witnesses to testify in his favor before the court, and they deny under oath that they can give testimony for him, then they are guilty of violating the witness' oath (comp. Lev. v. 1); cases and persons to whom the witness' oath applies; and forms under which the oath is administered to witnesses by the plaintiff, in order that they may be found guilty of breaking such oath in refusing to testify.
5. On the oath relating to a deposit ("shevu'at ha-pikadon"; compare Leviticus 5:21 et seq.), i.e., the oath taken in cases where objects have been wrongfully or forcibly acquired or retained; the persons taking it; and the cases in which it is taken.
6. Concerning the oath administered by the judge; in civil cases the judge administers it to the defendant only if he partly confesses his guilt; regulations regarding this oath, the minimum of the claim, and the minimum of the defendant's admission; in order that from the nature of a claim the defendant may be required to take the oath the plaintiff must be an adult of normal mind; the claim must be definitely formulated, and may have reference only to money, goods, or other movable objects; no oath may be enforced in connection with a claim to real estate, slaves, or bills of exchange, nor with a claim on the part of the Sanctuary.
7. The cases in which the plaintiff takes the oath, and wins his case on the strength of it, e.g., in the case of a hireling or storekeeper; other cases in which the defendant may be suspected of swearing falsely; enumeration of the cases in which the defendant may be compelled to take the oath even in reference to indefinite claims; thus every trustee in charge of property may be compelled to take an oath to the effect that he has managed it faithfully and honestly; on an oath occasioned by another oath ("gilgul shebu'ah").
8. The four kinds of wardens (compare Exodus 22:6-14): the unsalaried, the salaried, borrowers, and tenants.

== Tosefta ==
The Tosefta to this treatise is divided into six chapters, and contains some interesting moral maxims, besides additions to the Mishnah. R. Eleazar b. Mattai says that it is unpleasant for a person to behold a man commit crimes; but that a benefit is conferred upon a person if he is fortunate enough to behold a person perform noble deeds (3:4). A person who commits an act of unfaithfulness toward his fellow man has thereby committed an act of unfaithfulness toward God. Every crime is a denial of God; for the criminal who is about to commit the crime denies that God has forbidden all unjust and immoral deeds (3:6).

== Talmud ==
Both the Gemaras discuss and explain the contents of the Mishnah. The Babylonian Gemara contains in addition some interesting teachings and comments, among them:

- Psalm 91 is designated as "shir shel pega'im" or "nega'im" (= "the psalm of the plagues"; 15b).
- An interesting enumeration is given of the names, of God occurring in the Bible which really do not designate God, and of other names which must be referred to God, although they apparently do not apply to Him. Thus "Adonai" in the story of Lot (Genesis 19:18) designates God, although it might seem that Lot was addressing the angels by this name (35b). In the story of Micah (Judges 17-18) all the divine names that occur must be referred to God, though according to R. Eliezer only a few of them must be so referred. In the Song of Solomon the name "Solomon" designates God, except in one passage, 8:12 et seq. Noteworthy is R. Joshua's comment on Judges 20 to the effect that the oracle spoke truly all three times, but that the people did not ask the first and second times whether they would be victorious against Benjamin, and that this was not promised to them (ib.).
