= Yoma =

Tractate in Mishnah and Talmud

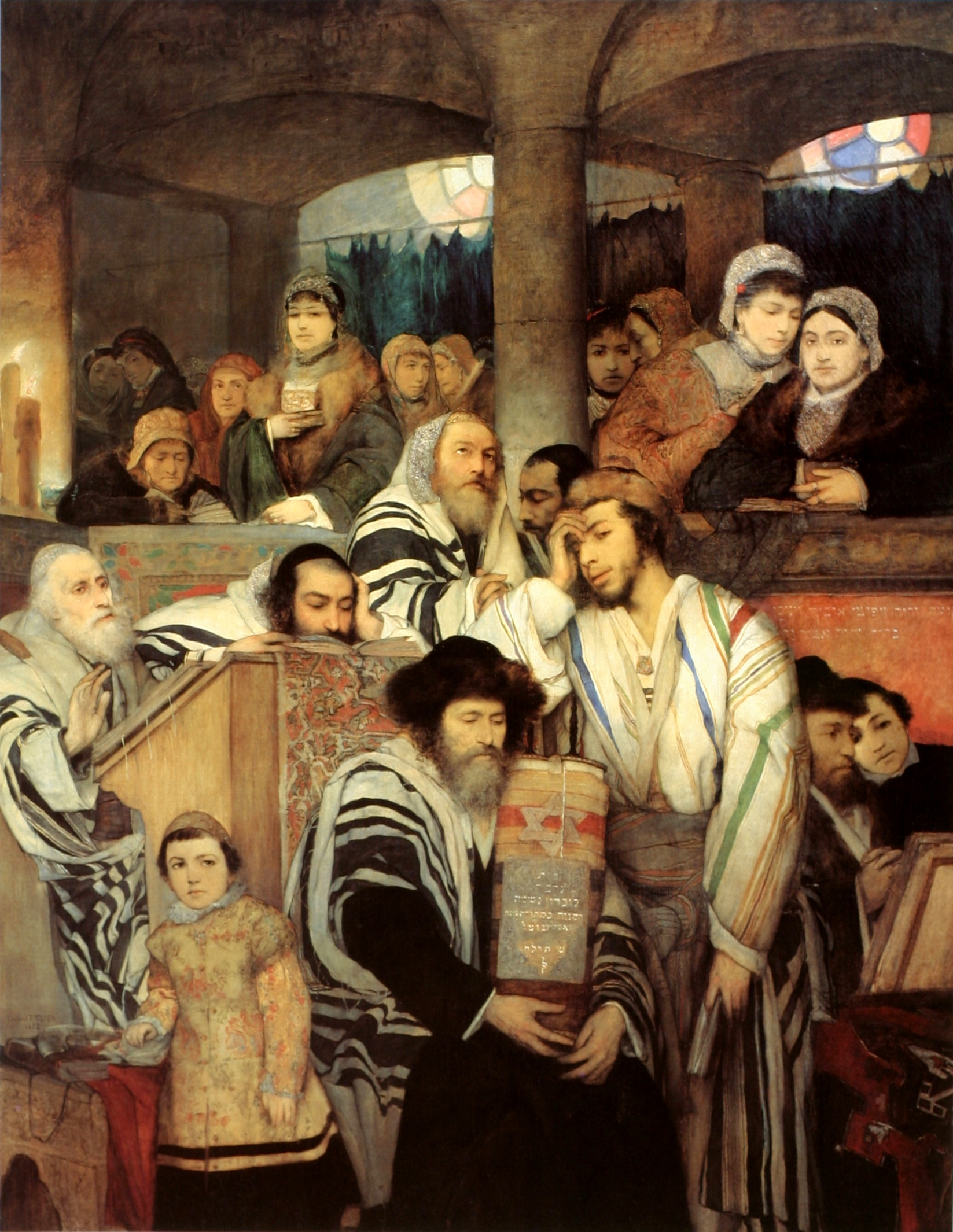
- Jews Praying in the Synagogue on Yom Kippur, by Maurycy Gottlieb (1878)

Tractate of the Talmud
- Seder: Moed
- Number of mishnahs: 61
- Chapters: 8
- Babylonian Talmud pages: 88
- Jerusalem Talmud pages: 42
- Tosefta chapters: 4

Yoma (Aramaic: יומא, lit. "The Day") is the fifth tractate of Seder Moed ('Order of Festivals') of the Mishnah and of the Talmud. It is concerned mainly with the laws of the Jewish holiday Yom Kippur, on which Jews atone for their sins from the previous year. It consists of eight chapters and has a Gemara ('Completion') from both the Jerusalem Talmud and the Babylonian Talmud.

== Content ==
The first chapter is regarding the seven days before Yom Kippur in which the Kohen Gadol is separated from his wife and moves into a chamber on the Beit HaMikdash, sprinkled with water from the Red Heifer and taught the laws relating to the Yom Kippur sacrifices.

The second through seventh chapters deal with the order of services on Yom Kippur, both those specific to Yom Kippur and the daily sacrifices. Some of the issues addressed include those of the lottery employed to assign services to Kohanim, laws regarding the scapegoat, and the incense sacrifices performed by the Kohen Gadol in the Holy of Holies.

The last chapter deals with the five afflictions of Yom Kippur, which apply in the absence of a Temple, including modern times. Five abstentions or strict avoidances are required:

- Eating or drinking
- Wearing leather shoes or things made from animals
- Anointing oneself with oil
- Washing
- Marital relations

The last chapter also discusses teshuva, or repentance (8:8-9).

== Intertextuality ==
Scholars note that certain elements of Mishnah Yoma, particularly those related to traditions that developed around Yom Kippur, reflect earlier Jewish traditions also found in the Gospel of Matthew.
