= Ketubot (tractate) =

Tractate of the Mishnah and the Talmud

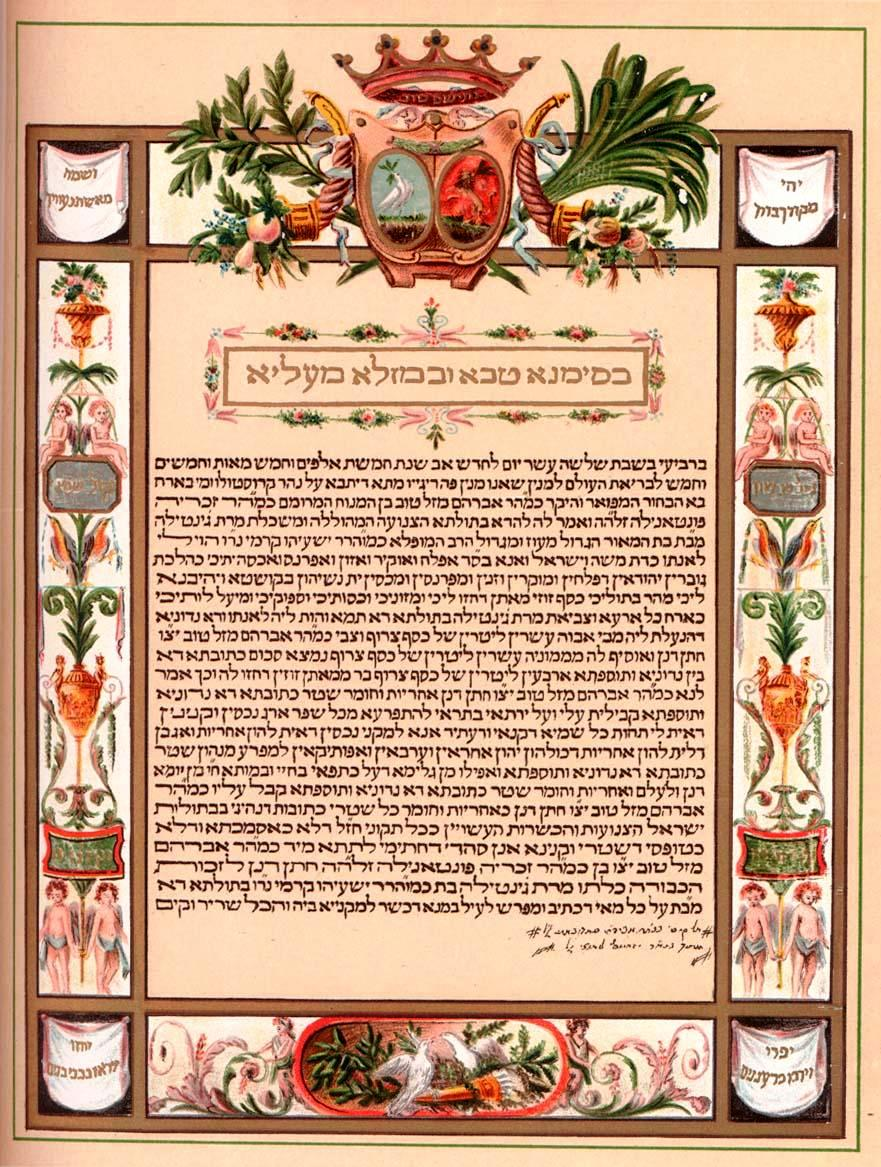
- An 18th century Ketubah

Tractate of the Talmud
- Seder: Nashim
- Number of mishnahs: 111
- Chapters: 13
- Babylonian Talmud pages: 112
- Jerusalem Talmud pages: 72
- Tosefta chapters: 12

Ketubot (Hebrew: כְּתוּבּוׂת) is a tractate of the Mishnah and the Talmud in the order of Nashim, composed in Babylon circa 450–550 CE. It deals with a variety of marital responsibilities, especially those intended for the marital contract, also named the ketubah. Due to the wide breadth of subjects discussed in this tractate, Ketubot is often referred to as the Shas katan (the miniature Talmud).

A ketubah (plural: ketubot) (in Hebrew: כְּתוּבָּה; plural: כְּתוּבּוׂת) is a special type of Jewish prenuptial agreement. It is considered an integral part of a traditional Jewish marriage, and describes the groom's rights and responsibilities towards the bride. Currently, the ketubah does not have a monetary value, however, it has legal value in Israel.

== Chapter headings ==
1. Betulah Niset (בְּתוּלָה נִשֵּׂאת)
2. Ha'isha Shennit'armelah (הָאִשָּׁה שֶׁנִּתְאַרְמְלָה)
3. Elu Nearot (אֵלּוּ נְעָרוֹת)
4. Na'arah shenitpatetah (נַעֲרָה שֶׁנִּתְפַּתְּתָה)
5. Af al pi she'amru (אַף עַל פִּי שֶׁאָמְרוּ)
6. Metziat ha'ishah (מְצִיאַת הָאִשָּׁה)
7. Hamadir et Ishto (הַמַּדִּיר אֶת אִשְׁתּוֹ)
8. Ha'ishah Shennafelu (הָאִשָּׁה שֶׁנָּפְלוּ)
9. Hakotev Le'ishto (הכותב לאשתו)
10. Mi Sh' Nasuy (מי שהיה נשוי)
11. Almanah Nizonet (אלמנה ניזונת)
12. Hanose Et Ha'ishah (הנושא את האשה)
13. Shnei Dayanei Gezeros (שני דייני גזירות)
