= Me'ilah =

Tractate of the Mishnah and the Talmud

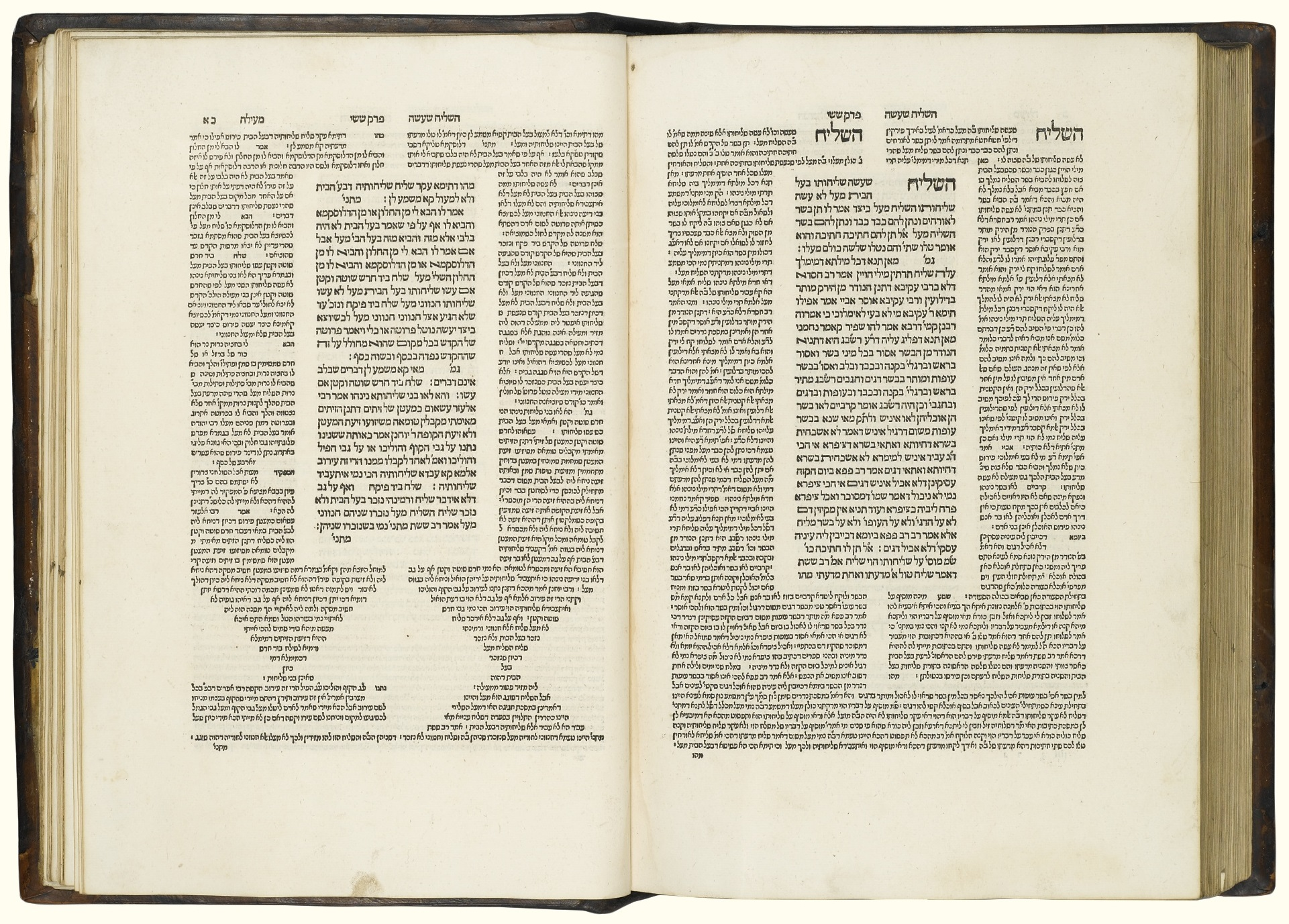

Me'ilah (מְעִילָה; "misuse of property") is a tractate of Seder Kodashim in the Mishnah, Tosefta, and Babylonian Talmud. It deals chiefly with the exact provisions of the law (Lev. 5:15-16) concerning the trespass-offering and the reparation which must be made by one who has used and enjoyed a consecrated thing.

== Mishnah ==
In the Mishnaic order this treatise is the eighth, and contains six chapters comprising 38 paragraphs in all. Its contents may be summarized as follows:

- Chapter 1: Sacrifices in which trespass can occur; in what parts: in the most holy sacrifices ("ḳodshe ḳodashim") in all parts and in the partly holy ("kodashim kallim") in certain parts only. Cases in which trespass can occur and those in which it can not occur. Rule of R. Joshua that if the priests have once had the right to eat of a sacrifice no trespass can take place (§ 1). In this connection the question is raised whether there can be a trespass in the case of those parts of the sacrifice which have been removed from the sanctuary before the sprinkling of the blood (§§ 2-3). Effects of the sprinkling upon the sacrificial animal with regard to trespass (§ 4).
- Chapter 2: The time after which a trespass can take place in the various meat-offerings, the different offerings of food, the Pentecostal bread, and the showbread. Closely allied with this is the determination of the time after which the different sacrifices may be invalidated by certain errors, and the period after which one may become guilty of "piggul" (abomination), "notar" (leaving something over from the sacrifice), and "ṭame" (impurity) in connection with them (§§ 1-9),
- Chapter 3: An enumeration of many things of which one may not partake, although if he does so, he is not guilty of trespass. This leads to a discussion of other regulations concerning certain of these things, as well as of the question whether and in what case one may be guilty of trespass in connection with objects belonging to or found upon certain consecrated things, such as grass in a consecrated field, the fruit of a consecrated tree (§ 6), and the foliage in a consecrated wood (§ 8).
- Chapter 4: The combination of various sacrifices in reckoning the minimum amount necessary to be used in order to constitute trespass (§§ 1-2). In this connection many more kinds of combinations are given with relation to other legal and ritual questions.
- Chapter 5: Determination of a peruṭa, the smallest coin, as the minimum value which the use of holy objects must have to make one guilty of trespass. Discussion of the question whether the use made of a consecrated object must be worth a peruṭa or whether the amount of the object consumed by this usage must equal a peruṭa; in connection with which a distinction is made between different objects (§ 1). The commission of trespass by various persons successively upon the same object.
- Chapter 6: Cases in which the trespass has been committed by proxy. The principle is laid down that if the agent has acted precisely in accordance with his orders, the person who gave such orders is guilty of the trespass; but if the agent has not so acted, he himself is guilty of the trespass. Enumeration of different examples (§§ 1-5). Cases in which neither of the two is guilty of trespass and instances in which both trespass (§ 4).

== Tosefta and Gemara ==
In the Tosefta, Me'ilah is the seventh treatise and has only three chapters. These, however, contain all that is in the six chapters of the Mishnah, with a few omissions and amplifications.

The Gemara to this treatise is devoted almost exclusively to elucidations of the mishnayot, there being only one aggadah in the treatise, bearing on the story of Ben Temalion.

There is no gemara of the Jerusalem Talmud to this treatise, nor in fact to any treatise of the order Kodashim.
