= Keritot =

Keritot is a tractate of the Mishnah and Babylonian Talmud. It is the seventh tractate in the Order of Kodashim. Its name is the plural of the punishment kareth which the Torah specifies for intentional violation of certain sins; unintentional violation of the same sins obligates one to bring a sin-offering instead.

== Mishnah ==
The Mishnah to Keritot contains six chapters, with the following contents:

1. A list of the 36 sins which incur kareth; laws of the sacrifice of the yoledet
2. Ritually impure people bring a sacrifice to finish the process of their purification; laws of the sacrifice for the shifcha harufah.
3. The number of sacrifices required by one who has committed a series of sins
4. The asham talui for one uncertain whether he has sinned
5. The prohibition on consuming blood, and the laws of asham meilot
6. One who brings a sacrifice and later learned that he had not sinned; whether the forgiveness of Yom Kippur exempts one from a sin-offering; etc.

== Talmud ==
The Talmud Bavli on tractate Keritot contains 27 pages. Page 6 of Keritot concerns the incense offering of the Temple. This is included in the standard Orthodox prayer book.
