= Yadayim =

Tractate of the Mishnah and the Talmud

Yadayim (Hebrew: ידיים, "hands") is a tractate of the Mishnah and the Tosefta, dealing with the impurity of the hands and their ablution. It is eleventh in the order Tohorot in most editions of the Mishnah.

== Mishnah ==
In the Mishnah, Yadayim is divided into for chapters, containing 22 paragraphs in all.

- Chapter 1: The quantity of water necessary to purify the hands by pouring it over them (§ 1); the vessels from which the water may be poured over the hands (§ 2); kinds of water which may not be used to purify the hands, and persons who may perform the act of manual ablution (§§ 3-5).
- Chapter 2: How the water should be poured over the hands, and the first and second ablutions (§§ 1-3); the hands are regarded as pure in all cases where doubt exists as to whether the ablution was properly performed (§ 4).
- Chapter 3: Things which render the hands impure; the canonical books make the hands impure. The holy writings were kept together with the equally sacred terumah ('heave offering') of the kohanim, and were injured by mice; to prevent this it was enacted that the holy writings defiled the hands as well as the terumah, thus leading to a discontinuance of the custom of keeping them together; discussion of the question whether the Song of Songs and Ecclesiastes are canonical, and thus render the hands impure; on the day of the election of Eleazar ben Azariah as nasi these books were declared canonical.
- Chapter 4: Other verdicts rendered on the same day in which the Song of Songs and Ecclesiastes were declared canonical, these rulings being corollaries of that decision (§ 1-4); the Biblical Aramaic in the Book of Ezra and the Book of Daniel, the Paleo-Hebrew alphabet, and dissensions between Pharisees and Sadducees (§§ 5-8).

== Tosefta ==
The Tosefta to this tracte is divided into two chapters. In addition to amplifications of the Mishnaic teachings, it contains various interesting maxims, of which the following may be mentioned:

- "The book of Ben Sira and all books of later date are no longer canonical" (2:13).
- The "Tovlei Shacharit" (= "Morning Immersers") said to the Pharisees: "We reproach you for uttering the Holy Name before your bodies have been purified of their impurities" (2:20).

== See also ==
- Handwashing in Judaism
