= Gemara =

Component of the Talmud

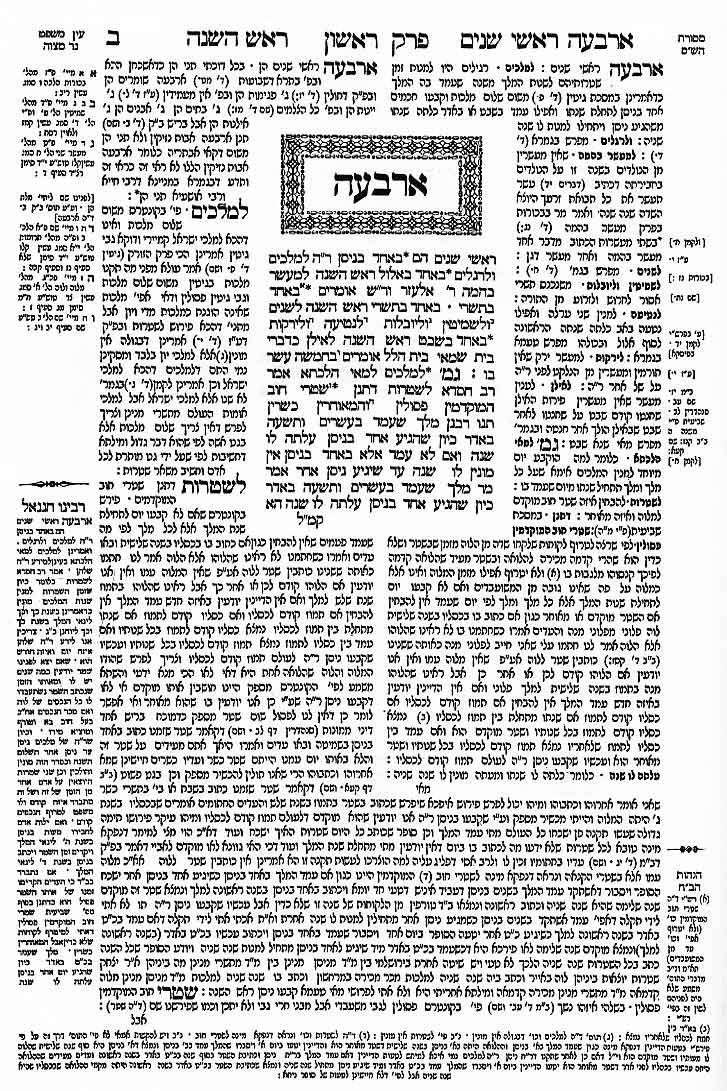
The first text page of tractate Rosh Hashanah. The center column contains the Talmud text, beginning with a section of Mishnah. The Gemara begins 8 lines down with the abbreviation 'גמ (gimmel-mem). Mishnah and Gemara sections alternate throughout the Talmud text. The large blocks of text on either side are the Tosafot and Rashi commentaries. Other notes and cross references are in the margins.

The Gemara (also transliterated Gemarah, or in Yiddish Gemore) comprises a collection of rabbinical analyses and commentaries on the Mishnah presented in 63 books. The term is derived from the Aramaic word גמרא and rooted in the Semitic word ג-מ-ר (gamar), which means "to finish" or "complete". Initially, the Gemara was transmitted orally and not permitted to be written down. However, after Judah the Prince compiled the Mishnah around 200 CE, rabbis from Babylonia and the Land of Israel extensively studied the work. Their discussions were eventually documented in a series of books, which would come to be known as the Gemara. There are two versions of the Talmud: the Babylonian Talmud (Talmud Bavli) and the Jerusalem Talmud (Talmud Yerushalmi). The Mishnah is virtually the same in two Talmuds; the Gemara is what differentiates the Babylonian Talmud from its Jerusalem counterpart.

The Babylonian Talmud, compiled by scholars in Babylonia around 500 CE and primarily from the academies of Sura, Pumbedita, and Nehardea, is the more commonly cited version when referring to the "Gemara" or "Talmud"; redaction of the Jerusalem Talmud was interrupted in the mid-fourth century when the Romans suppressed Jewish scholarship in the Palestinian provinces and most Talmudists fled to Babylon. As a result, the Bavli was more intensively edited, studied, and commented on. The main compilers of the Babylonian Talmud were Ravina and Rav Ashi. The Jerusalem Talmud was compiled by Jewish scholars in the Land of Israel, primarily from the academies of Tiberias and Caesarea, around 350–400 CE.

The Talmud is organized into six sedarim, or "orders:" Zeraim, Moed, Nashim, Nezikin, Kodshim, and Taharot.

In 1923, Polish Rabbi Meir Shapiro introduced a contemporary practice called "Daf Yomi," or "daily page," wherein participants study one page of the Talmud daily in cycles lasting seven and a half years each. This initiative ensures that both scholars and laypeople across the globe engage in the comprehensive study of the entire Talmud.

== Gemara and Mishnah ==
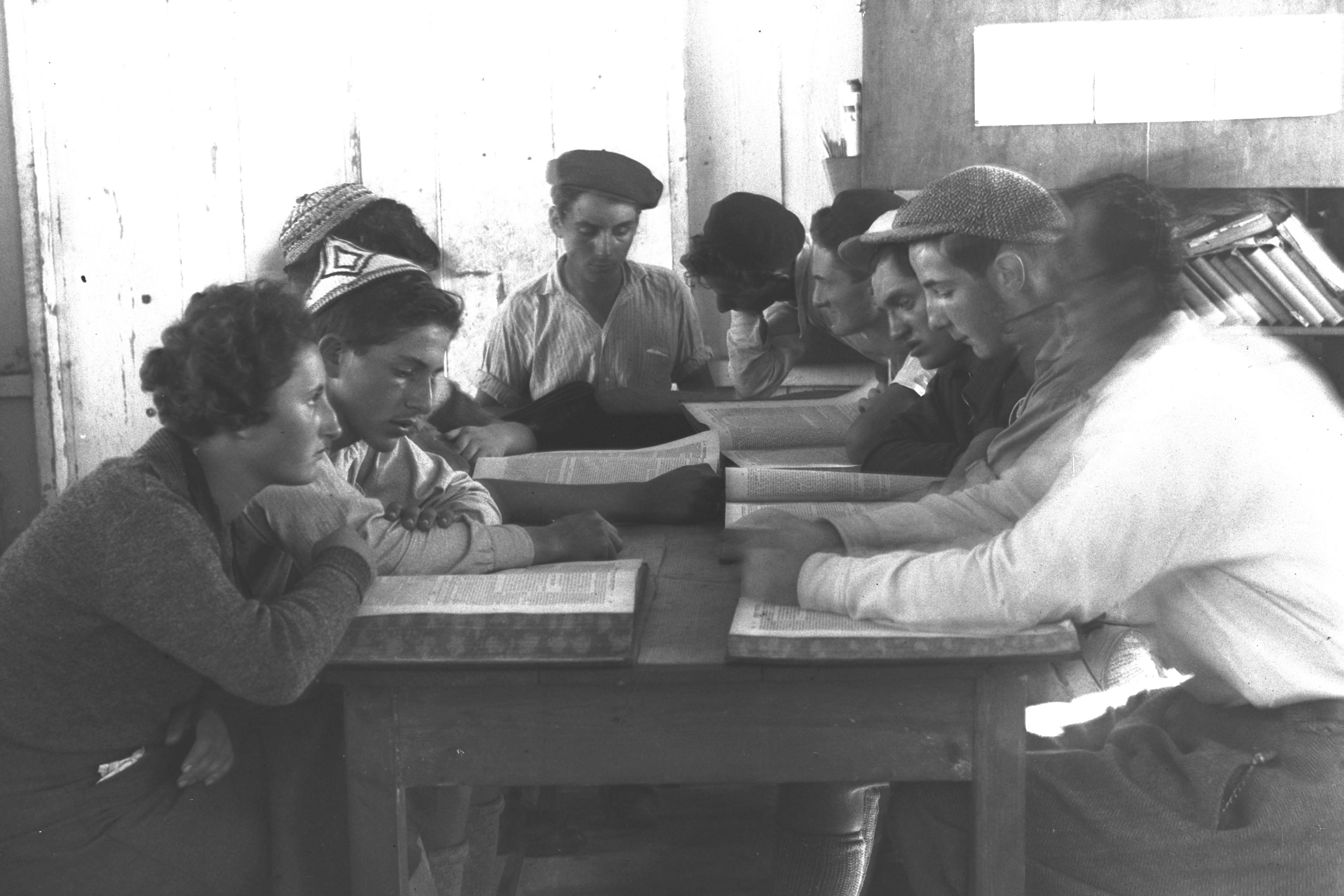
Members of Kvutzat Rodges studying the Gemara (June 1, 1935)

Maimonides describes the Gemara as:

understanding and conceptualizing the ultimate derivation of a concept from its roots, inferring one concept from another and comparing concepts, understanding [the Law] based on the principles of Torah exegesis, until one appreciates the essence of those principles and how the prohibitions and the other decisions which one received according to the oral tradition (i.e. Mishnah) can be derived using them....

The rabbis of the Mishnah are known as Tannaim (sing. Tanna תנא). The rabbis of the Gemara are referred to as Amoraim (sing. Amora אמורא). The analysis of the Amoraim, recorded as gemara, is thus focused on clarifying the positions, views, and word choice of the Tannaim.

Because there are two Gemaras, as mentioned above, there are in fact two Talmuds: the Jerusalem Talmud (Hebrew: תלמוד ירושלמי, "Talmud Yerushalmi"), and the Babylonian Talmud (Hebrew: תלמוד בבלי, "Talmud Bavli"), corresponding to the Jerusalem Gemara and the Babylonian Gemara; both share the same Mishnah. The Gemara is mostly written in Aramaic, the Jerusalem Gemara in Western Aramaic and the Babylonian in Eastern Aramaic, but both contain portions in Hebrew. Sometimes the language changes in the middle of a story.

== Origins of the word ==
In a narrow sense, the word gemara refers to the mastery and transmission of existing tradition, as opposed to sevara, which means the deriving of new results by logic. Both activities are represented in the Gemara as one literary work.

The Aramaic noun gemar (and gemara) was formed from the verb that means "learn." This substantive noun thus designates what was learned, and the learning transmitted to scholars by tradition, though it connotes in a more limited sense to exposition of the Mishnah. The word therefore gained currency as a designation of the Talmud. In the modern editions, the term gemara occurs frequently in this sense—but in nearly every case it was substituted at a later time for the objectionable word talmud, which was prohibited by the Christian censors. The only passage in which gemara occurs with the meaning of "Talmud" in the strict sense, and not censored, is Eruvin 32b, where it is used by Rav Nahman, a Babylonian amora (3rd C.). Later editions of the Talmud frequently substitute for the word "Gemara" the Aramaic abbreviation for "the six orders of the Mishnah," pronounced as "Shas," which has become a popular designation for the Babylonian Talmud.

== The Sugya ==
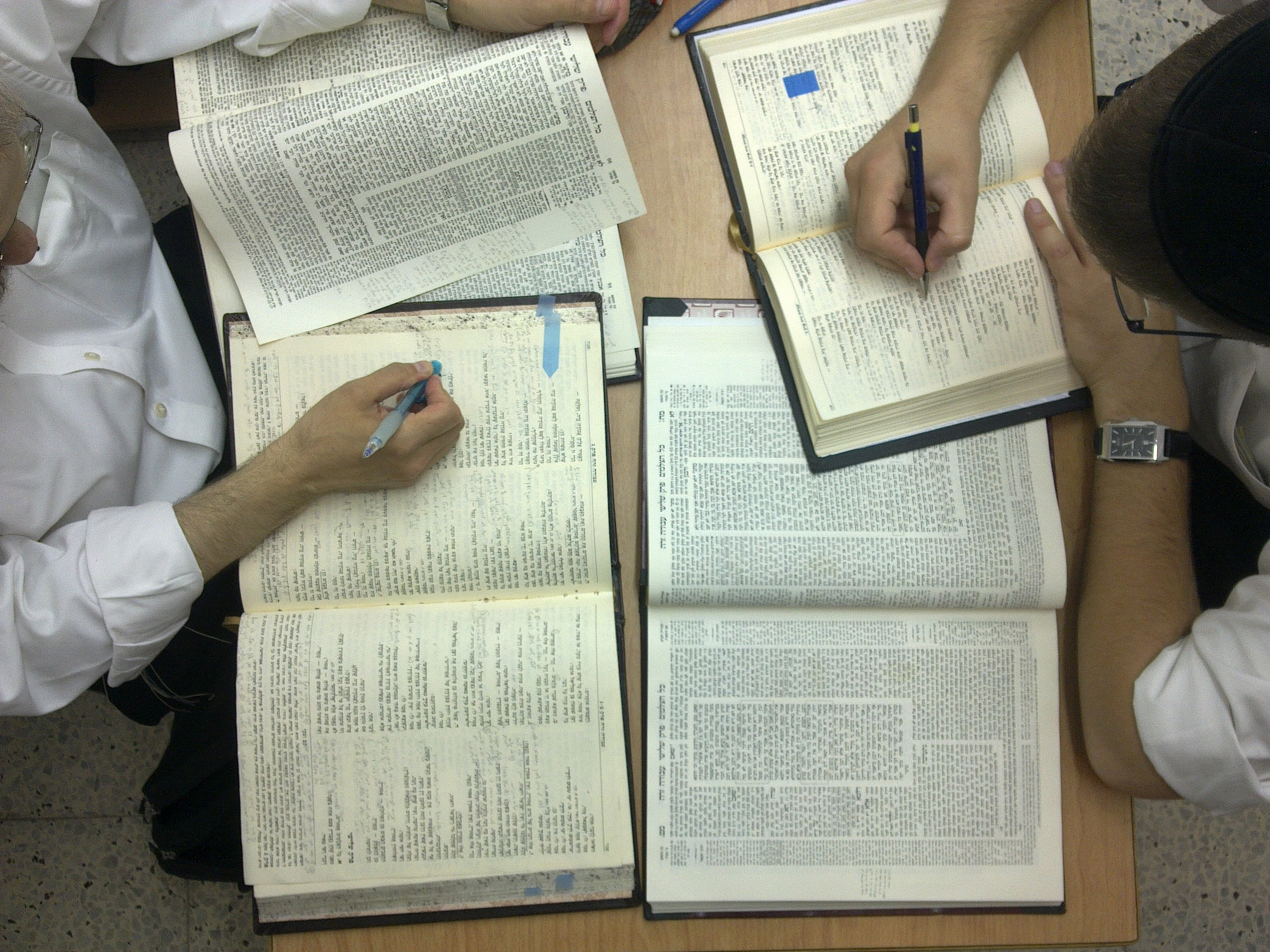
Gemara students in chavrusa recording their summary of each sugya alongside its Mishnah (using the Mishnah Sdura edition)

The building block of gemara is known as a sugya, "a self-contained basic unit of Talmudic discussion" (p. 203) that often centers on a statement from the mishnah, the amoraic rabbis (memra), or simply independent of these. They vary in size and complexity and, though self-contained, may mention or assume knowledge of other sugiyot.

The analysis of the Amoraim is generally focused on clarifying the positions, words and views of the Tannaim. These debates and exchanges form the "building-blocks" of the Gemara; the name for such a passage of Gemara is a sugya (סוגיא; plural sugyot). A sugya will typically comprise a detailed proof-based elaboration of the Mishna. Every aspect of the Mishnaic text is treated as a subject of close investigation. This analysis is aimed at an exhaustive understanding of the Mishna's full meaning.

In the Talmud, a sugya is presented as a series of responsive hypotheses and questions – with the Talmudic text as a record of each step in the process of reasoning and derivation. The Gemara thus takes the form of a dialectical exchange (by contrast, the Mishnah states concluded legal opinions – and often differences in opinion between the Tannaim. There is little dialogue). The disputants here are termed the makshan (questioner, "one who raises a difficulty") and tartzan (answerer, "one who puts straight").

The Gemara records the semantic disagreements between Tannaim and Amoraim. Some of these debates were actually conducted by the Amoraim, though many of them are hypothetically reconstructed by the Talmud's redactors. (Often imputing a view to an earlier authority as to how he may have answered a question: "This is what Rabbi X could have argued ...") Only rarely are debates formally closed.

== Argumentation and debate ==
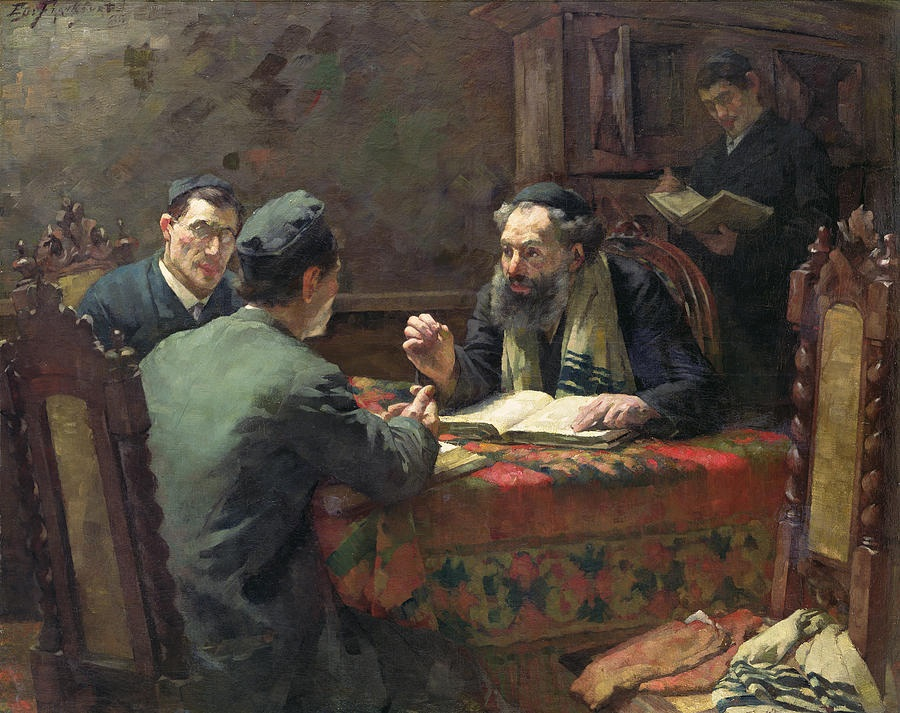
"Theologisch debat" (Eduard Frankfort, c. 1900), depicting a chavrusa debating a sugya

The distinctive character of the gemara derives largely from the intricate use of argumentation and debate, described above; these "back and forth" analytics are characterized by the Talmudic phrase shakla v'tarya (שקלא וטריא; lit. "taking and throwing"). In each sugya, either participant may cite scriptural, Mishnaic and Amoraic proof to build a logical support for their respective opinions. The process of deduction required to derive a conclusion from a prooftext is often logically complex and indirect. "Confronted with a statement on any subject, the Talmudic student will proceed to raise a series of questions before he satisfies himself of having understood its full meaning." This analysis has been described as "mathematical" in approach; Adin Steinsaltz makes the analogy of the Amoraim as scientists investigating the Halakha, where the Tanakh, Mishnah, Tosefta and midrash are the phenomena studied.

=== Prooftexts ===
Prooftexts quoted to corroborate or disprove the respective opinions and theories will include:

- verses from the Tanakh: the exact language employed is regarded as significant;
- other mishnayot: cross-references to analogous cases, or to parallel reasoning by the Tanna in question;
- Beraitot (ברייתות) – uncodified mishnayot which are also sources of halakha (lit. outside material; sing. beraita ברייתא);
  - references to opinions and cases in the Tosefta (תוספתא);
  - references to the Halakhic Midrash (Mekhilta, Sifra and Sifre);
- cross-references to other sugyot: again to analogous cases or logic.

=== Questions addressed ===
The actual debate will usually centre on the following categories:

==== Language ====
Why does the Mishna use one word rather than another? If a statement is not clear enough, the Gemara seeks to clarify the Mishna's intention.

==== Logic ====
Exploring the logical principles underlying the Mishnah's statements, and showing how different understandings of the Mishnah's reasons could lead to differences in their practical application. What underlying principle is entailed in a statement of fact or in a specific instance brought as an illustration? If a statement appears obvious, the Gemara seeks the logical reason for its necessity. It seeks to answer under which circumstances a statement is true, and what qualifications are permissible. All statements are examined for internal consistency. See: List of Talmudic principles and Category:Talmud concepts and terminology

==== Legal ====
Resolving contradictions, perceived or actual, between different statements in the Mishnah, or between the Mishnah and other traditions; e.g., by stating that: two conflicting sources are dealing with differing circumstances; or that they represent the views of different rabbis. Do certain authorities differ or not? If they do, why do they differ? If a principle is presented as a generalization, the Gemara clarifies how much is included; if an exception, how much is excluded.

==== Biblical exposition ====
Demonstrating how the Mishnah's rulings or disputes derive from interpretations of Biblical texts, the Gemara will often ask where in the Torah the Mishnah derives a particular law. See Talmudic hermeneutics and Oral Torah § The interplay of the Oral and Written Law.

== See also ==
- Daf Yomi
- Hadran (Talmud)
- List of masechtot, chapters, mishnahs and pages in the Talmud
- Oral Torah
- Shiur § Format
- Siyum HaShas
- Yarchei Kallah
- Yeshiva § Talmud study
- Rabbinic works elaborating the analytical methods employed in Gemara:
  - Shev Shema'tata - R. Aryeh Leib HaCohen Heller
  - Derech Tevunot and Sefer HaHigayon - R. Moshe Chaim Luzzatto
  - Mevo haTalmud - Shmuel HaNagid
