= Zadok HaKohen =

Hasidic rabbi (1823–1900)

Zadok HaKohen Rabinowitz
- צדוק הכהן מלובלין
- Born: February 4, 1823; Krustpils
- Died: September 3, 1900 (aged 77); Lublin
- Movement: Hasidic Judaism

Rabbi Zadok ha-Kohen Rabinowitz of Lublin (Hebrew: צדוק הכהן מלובלין) (Krustpils, Vitebsk Governorate, Russian Empire, February 4, 1823 – Lublin, Poland, September 3, 1900, ), or Tzadok Hakohen or Tzadok of Lublin, was a significant Jewish thinker and Hasidic leader.

== Biography ==
He was born into a Lithuanian Rabbinic family and then became a follower of the Hasidic Rebbe, Rabbi Mordechai Yosef Leiner of Izhbitza, and of Yehuda Leib Eiger (grandson of the famed Rabbi Akiva Eiger, son of Rabbi Solomon Eger, and another student of Mordechai Leiner), whom he succeeded in 1888. He was also a disciple of Rabbi Sholom Rokeach of Belz. He is an example of a Litvish Jew who became Chasidic.

As a young man he gained widespread acclaim as an illuy (an exceptional talmudist). Rabbi Zadok refused to accept any rabbinic post for most of his life. His wife supported them both by running a small used clothing store. Upon the death of Eiger in 1888, Zadok Hakohen agreed to take over the leadership of the Lublin Hasidim, along with Eiger's son Rabbi Avraham Eiger. It was then that he began to give his public classes that would take place on Shabbat, Holidays, Rosh Chodesh and special occasions. The transcriptions of those classes were compiled into his work known as Pri Tzadik.

Rabbi Zadok was a prolific writer in all areas of Judaism, halakhah, Hasidut, Kabbalah, angelology, and ethics; he also wrote scholarly essays on astronomy, geometry, and algebra.

One of his lone surviving students was Rabbi Michael Mokotovsky, whose son was Rabbi Avraham Eliyahu Mokotovsky, better known by his penname Eliyahu Kitov.

== Ideas ==
Zadok HaKohen's philosophy of Judaism very much continues the thinking of his teacher Rabbi Mordechai Yosef Leiner. Zadok HaKohen was a much more prolific writer than Leiner had been. It is therefore difficult to determine where Rabbi Zadok's writing is a mere articulation of ideas left somewhat veiled (albeit possibly purposely) in the writings of Leiner, and where Rabbi Zadok is actually introducing new ideas.

=== Tzidkas HaTzaddik ===
Zadok HaKohen wrote that a lot can be learnt about a person from his dreams; what we dream is a reflection of who we are. It is the measure of our aspirations and goals, and of those values we hold dear and place above all else.

One does not squelch the evil inclination but rather helps channel its energies positively.

=== Pri Tzaddik, Genesis ===
Humanity's first sin was not Adam and Eve's eating of forbidden fruit, but rather the way they ate it. The Tree of Knowledge, says he, was not a tree or a food or a thing at all. Rather it was a way of eating. Whenever a person grabs self-conscious pleasure from the world, he falls, at that moment, from God consciousness, and eats from the Tree of Knowledge.

=== Takkanas HaShavim ===
Zadok HaKohen said that the Oral Law developed to its full potential after the victory of the Hasmoneans over the Greek culture, a culture characterized by deep analysis and hair-splitting argument. These virtues were converted to a holy nature with the victory of Israel over Greece. This was the fulfillment of the verse “God will give beauty to Yefet and this beauty will dwell in the tents of Shem” (as per Megillah 9b). After the victory, Jews could begin the successful integration of natural science, logic, and philosophy into the world of the Written Law. Only then could the Oral Law truly begin to flourish.

== Influence ==
Zadok HaKohen's philosophy was a major influence on Rabbi Yitzchok Hutner.

Rabbi Moshe Tuvia Lieff has given numerous lectures on the works of Zadok HaKohen.

== Works ==
- Resisei Layla
- Takkanas HaShavim
- Tzidkas HaTzadik
- Machashavos Charutz
- Sichat Malachei HaShareit
- Divrei Sofrim
- Poked Akarim
- Likkutei Ma'amarim
- Dover Tzedek
- Yisrael Kedoshim
- Ohr Zarua LaTzadik
- Pri Tzadik (Compiled by his students from his weekly classes)
- Otzar Hamelech (comments on the Rambam, and a long Tshuva on Tumas Ohel)

== Bibliography ==
- Brill, Alan (2002). Thinking God: The Mysticism of Rabbi Zadok HaKohen Of Lublin. Ktav: Yeshiva University Press. ISBN 9780881257267.
- Elman, Y. (1986). "Reb Zadok Hakohen of Lublin on Prophecy in the Halakhic Process". Jewish Law Association Studies. 1 (1). Scholars Press: 1–16.
- Elman, Y. (1985). "R. Zadok HaKohen on the History of Halakha". Tradition. 21 (4): 1–26. Archived from the original on 2007-08-07.
