= Solomon Eger =

German rabbi

Rabbi Solomon Eger

Personal life
- Born: 1785 or 1786 (5546 Anno Mundi) Leszno, Polish–Lithuanian Commonwealth (modern-day Poland)
- Died: 22 December 1852 (aged 65–66) (11 Tevet 5613 Anno Mundi) Posen, Kingdom of Prussia (modern-day Poznań, Poland)
- Buried: Posen
- Children: Judah Leib Eger
- Parent: Akiva Eger (father)
- Occupation: Rabbi

Religious life
- Religion: Judaism
- Denomination: Haredi Orthodox Judaism
- Residence: Warsaw, Kalisz, Posen

Rabbi Solomon Eger (also spelled as Solomon Eiger) (1785 or 1786 – 22 December 1852) was an influential rabbi and successor of his father as the rabbi of Posen, then in Germany (now Poland).

== Life ==
He was born to Rabbi Akiva Eger and his first wife, Glickel (or Glickhen). His older brother, Abraham Eger (1781–1853) was also a rabbi in Rawicz.

He studied with his father, and afterwards he started working as a merchant in Warsaw, but in 1831 he lost his fortune due to the November uprising. Later he became the rabbi of Kalisz and, after the death of his father in 1837, in 1839 he was appointed rabbi of Posen. In 1844 he asked the permission of King Frederick William IV to establish an agricultural village in the province of Posen, but in 1848 his initiative was halted due to another uprising. He was a staunch opponent of Reform Judaism, and, when in 1838 a controversy broke out in Breslau about who should be elected as local chief rabbi, Rabbi Gedaliah Tiktin was eventually confirmed by the king not independently of Eger's support. Following the Rabbinical Conference of Brunswick and Frankfurt he decided to issue a ban on Reform Judaism, and even travelled to Rabbi Jacob Ettlinger to Altona and to Rabbi Nathan Marcus Adler to Hannover to gain support for his initiative, but, despite agreeing with Eger's reasoning, they were wary to fully support his proposal.

Many of Eger's letters appeared in his father's collected responsa, but he was in correspondence with other leading rabbis of his generation as well. He took his father's side during the debate between the Romm publishing house in Vilna and the Shapiro press in Slavita, which was a part of the long-standing feud between the Misnagdim and Chasidim movements. The latter party accused Eger of having influenced his father by dishonest means:

My heart is terribly disturbed by the gall of the Slavita printers. Not only have they lied concerning my son, accusing him of having swayed my heart; but even worse they have spoken against me, accusing me of being enticed into judging a matter without first hearing from both sides, Heaven forfend!

— Rabbi Akiva Eger

== Family ==
His sister, Sarah (or Sorel) Eger was the second wife of Rabbi Moses Sofer in Pressburg.

His son, Rabbi Judah Leib Eger (1816–1888) turned into a Chasid through the influence of Yitzchak Meir Alter in Warsaw, and later founded the Lublin Chasidic dynasty. An old legend of questionable credibility claims that Eger sat shiva for his own son, when he started studying at another Chasidic Rabbi, Menachem Mendel of Kotzk. Subsequently, Judah Leib left to study under Rabbi Mordechai Yosef Leiner, the founder of the Izhbitza–Radzyn dynasty, and became a Chasidic rebbe after his death along with his son, Rabbi Yaakov Leiner. Eger's granddaughter, Ulla Wolff, was a prominent playwright, novelist, and journalist.

== Works ==
- Gilyon Maharsha (גליון מהרש"א): notes on the Talmud and on Alfasi's Code appended to the Vilna Talmud (1859)
- Gilyon Rasha (גליון רש"א): notes on Yoreh De'ah (1859)
- Toledot Rabbenu Akiva Eger (תולדות עקיבא איגר): biography of Rabbi Akiva Eger co-written with his brother, Abraham (1862)
- Sefer Igerot Soferim (איגרות סופרים): collected letters of the Eger and Schreiber family edited by Rabbi Solomon Schreiber (1929)
- Shut Rasha (שו"ת רש"א): collected responsa (1983–1985)
- Sefer haIkarim (ספר העיקרים): essays on halakhic issues (1992–1996)
