= Ulla Wolff =

German-Jewish playwright (1850–1924)

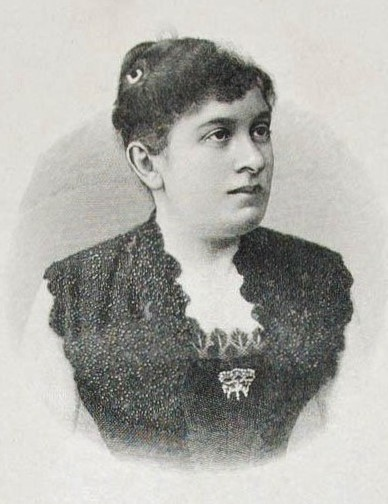
- Portrait of Wolff, c. 1890
- Born: Ulla Hirschfeld; 2 April 1850; Gleiwitz, Silesia, Kingdom of Prussia
- Died: 1 January 1924 (aged 73); Berlin, Prussia, Weimar Republic
- Writing career
- Pen name: Ulrich Frank

Ulla Wolff-Frankfurter (née Hirschfeld; 2 April 1850, in Gleiwitz – 1 January 1924, in Berlin), also known by the pen names Ulla Frank and Ulrich Frank, was a German Jewish playwright, novelist, and journalist.

== Biography ==
Ulla Hirschfeld was born in Gleiwitz, Silesia, into a scholarly Jewish family. Her father, Hirsch (Max) Hirschfeld, was a rabbi and philosopher of religion, while her maternal grandfather, Solomon Eger, served as Chief Rabbi of Posen. She received her education at home and later in Breslau and Vienna.

In 1869, she married Rabbi Dr. Lazar Frankfurter, an Italian language and literature professor, with whom she bore three children, including Richard Frankfurter. She took up residence in Berlin soon after her husband's death in 1878 and married Jewish industrialist Louis Wolff in 1880. She would have two more children from her second marriage.

She died on 1 January 1924 at the age of 74.

== Work ==
Wolff-Frankfurter's first production, Ein Vampyr, appeared in 1876 at the Lobetheater in Breslau, and was well received. This was followed in 1878 by Der Herr College. Thereupon, she gave up writing for the stage and devoted her literary activity to stories and novels. Her publications often explored the tension between tradition and modernity in the Jewish family, and the isolated experiences of ghetto and shtetl life.

As a journalist, she headed the Berlin feature section of the Hamburgischer Correspondent newspaper for over 15 years, and wrote for other newspapers and magazines, especially for the Berliner Tageblatt, the Jahrbuch für jüdische Geschichte und Literatur, the Allgemeine Zeitung des Judentums, and the Breslauer Zeitung. She was also the Berlin correspondent of the New Yorker Staats-Zeitung.

== Partial bibliography ==
- Der Herr College (in German). Vienna: Wallishausser. 1877.
- Ein Vampyr (in German). Vienna: Wallishausser. 1877.
- Waldgeheimniss. Ein soziales Märchen (in German). Norden: Fischer Nachfolger. 1880.
- Das Wunderkind. Erzählung (in German). Berlin: Abenheim'sche Verlagsbuchhandlung. 1884.
- Weltliche Beichte (in German). Leipzig: Friedrich. 1887.
- Der Kampf ums Glück. Roman (in German). Berlin: Freund und Jeckel. 1888.
- Zwei Novellen. Frau Ottilie. Bettler's Heim (in German). Berlin: Freund und Jeckel. 1890.
- Rechtsanwalt Arnau. Roman (in German). Berlin: Freund und Jeckel. 1891.
- Sollen Damen allein reisen und andere Novellen (in German). Berlin: Freund und Jeckel. 1892.
- Der Kompagnon (in German). 1895.
- Adlig (in German). Berlin: H. Steinitz. 1895.
- Gestern und Heute. Roman (in German). Berlin: H. Steinitz. 1896.
- Die Berlinerin. Bilder und Geschichten. Mit 90 Illustrationen von Friedrich Stahl (in German). Berlin: Concordia. 1897.
- Die Frühlingsgnade. Novellen (in German). Berlin: Freund und Jeckel. 1897.
- Margarete Eilert. Roman (in German). Berlin: Freund und Jeckel. 1898.
- "Die Toten". Jahrbuch für jüdische Geschichte und Literatur. 3. Berlin: Albert Katz. 1900.
- Die Lene. Roman (in German). Berlin: C. Freund. 1903.
- "Simon Eichelkatz. Aus dem Tagebuch eines Arztes". Jahrbuch für jüdische Geschichte und Literatur. 6. Berlin: M. Poppelauer. 1903.
- Simon Eichelkatz und andere Novellen (in German). Berlin: S. Schottländer. 1903.
- Der Stern. Roman (in German). Berlin: A. Schall. 1905.
- Die Einsiedlerin. Roman (in German). Berlin: S. Schottländer. 1905.
- * Simon Eichelkatz and The Patriarch: Two Stories of Jewish Life. Philadelphia: Jewish Publication Society of America. 1907 [1903].
- "Naemi Ehrenfest". Jahrbuch für jüdische Geschichte und Literatur. 8. Berlin: M. Poppelauer. 1907.
- "Mischpoche". Jahrbuch für jüdische Geschichte und Literatur. 10. Berlin: M. Poppelauer. 1907.
- Frauen von Heute (in German). Berlin: H. Steinitz. 1908.
- Der Mischpoche-Rentner und andere Erzählungen (in German). Berlin: Louis Lamm. 1913.
