= Annotated edition =

An annotated edition is a literary work where marginal comments have been added to explain, interpret, or illuminate words, phrases, themes, or other elements of the text. The annotated edition is often something pursued by historical or literary scholars, as a secular parallel to the exegesis annotations of the Bible.

Notably, certain publishers provide annotated editions that are well received, such as Norton Critical Editions or the Folger Shakespeare Library editions.

Some annotations are brief, requiring only one or a few sentences. Others are lengthy, continuing for one or more pages. Normally, the text occupies the center of the page, and the annotations, which are keyed numerically to the words and phrases with which they are associated, run down the left side of the left page and down the right side of the right page. However, sometimes the annotations appear at the bottom of both pages, as in The New Schofield Reference Bible and The Riverside Shakespeare.
