= Lublin (Hasidic dynasty) =

Polish Hasidic dynasty

Lublin is a Hasidic dynasty founded by Rabbi Yehuda Leib Eiger (also known as "Leibel", or "Leibele") of Lublin, a town in Poland. It is a branch of Izhbitza-Radzin Hasidus.

After the death of Rabbi Mordechai Yosef Leiner (the founder of Izhbitza-Radzin Hasidus) in 1854, the Hasidus split into two parts. Most of the hasidim followed Rabbi Yaakov Leiner, the son of Rabbi Mordechai Yosef, who moved the Hasidus to the town of Radzin, (hence the name Izhbitza-Radzin Hasidus). Others, however, followed Rabbi Eiger to Lublin.

Rabbi Eiger led the hasidus with his close friend, Rabbi Zadok HaKohen Rabbinowitz (also spelled "Tzaddok HaKohein") who was a fellow student of the Rabbi Mordechai Yosef Leiner in Ishbitz.

After the death of Rabbi Eiger in 1888, the hasidus was led by his son, Rabbi Avraham Eiger, and Rabbi Tzaddok HaKohein. The hasidus continued to be led by Rabbi Avraham Eiger after the death of Rabbi Tzaddok in 1900.

The hasidus was led by Rabbi Eiger's progeny in Lublin until World War II, when they escaped from the Holocaust to Shanghai, China. A grandson of Rabbi Avraham Eiger, also name Rabbi Avraham Eiger, reestablished the hasidus in Bnei Brak in Israel where it remains to this day.

== Lineage ==
Rabbi Yehuda Leib Eiger (1817 - 1888) was a son of Rabbi Shlomo Eiger of Posen, and a grandson of Rabbi Akiva Eiger.
