= Reuven Kalisher =

Jewish Doctor

- Born: 25 April 1828; Dubno, Russian Empire
- Died: 20 August 1896 (aged 68); Kyiv, Russian Empire
- Known for: Maintained the view that the Torah-mentioned tzaraath is not leprosy but in fact vitiligo

Reuven Kalisher (Note: Hebrew: ראובן קאלישער) (25 April 1828 – 20 August 1896), resident of Zhytomir, was a Jewish doctor and Hebrew-language literist.

== Vitiligo and Tzaraath ==
Kalisher maintained the view that the Torah-mentioned tzaraath is not leprosy but in fact vitiligo, Yehuda L. Katzenelson quotes Kalisher's view in his work on medicinal talmudic work (הרפואה וחכמת התלמוד berlin, 1928).

== Literary works ==
- Natural works and medicine (Hebrew) Warsaw, 1862.
