= Tzaraath =

Conditions of the skin, clothing and houses in the Torah

Tzaraath (Hebrew: צָרַעַת ṣāraʿaṯ), variously transcribed into English and frequently translated as leprosy (though it is not Hansen's disease, the disease known as "leprosy" in modern times), is a term used in the Bible to describe various ritually impure disfigurative conditions of the human skin, clothing, and houses. Skin tzaraath generally involves patches that are white and contain unusually colored hair. Clothing and house tzaraath consists of a reddish or greenish discoloration.

The laws of tzaraath are given in depth in chapters 13–14 of Leviticus, and several Biblical stories describe individuals who have contracted tzaraath.

== Name ==
Variant transcriptions of the name into English include saraath, zaraath, tzaraat, tsaraat, tzaraas, tzoraas, and tsaraas.

The Hebraic root tsara or tsaraath (צָרַע "to be struck with leprosy, to be leprous"), and the Greek lepros (λεπρός), refer to conditions other than Hansen's disease. The editors of the Septuagint translated the term tzaraath with Greek lepra (λέπρα), which in classical sources referred to psoriasis and similar skin conditions; at the time Hansen's disease was known in Greek by a different term (elephantiasis graecorum). The connection with the bacterial infection now known as Hansen's disease increased as the latter disease spread more widely, and was firmly established by Islamic works on medicine in the 9th century. The classical Greek term lepra stems from the noun lepis λεπίς (a scale (of a fish)), which in turn stems from the verb lepó λέπω (to peel), hence 'leprosy' (literally, morbid scaliness). Variants of the word leprosy conflating tzaraath with Hansen's disease were used from the earliest English translations of the Bible, including Wycliffe's, Tyndale's, and Coverdale's.

The linguistic root of tzaraath (צרע) may mean "smiting"; the Arabic cognate ṣaraʕa (صرع) has a similar meaning. Alternatively, tzaraath may be derived from the Hebrew word tzirah (wasp), based on the idea that tzaraat affects the skin in a manner resembling a wasp's sting. Other theories suggest a connection to the roots שרע ("to spread") or זרע ("seed", i.e. a growth).

The manifestation of tzaraath is termed a negah (נגע) "affliction", nega'im (plural: נגעים).

== Affliction of the body ==
There are three varieties of nega'im that relate to human flesh:

1. on the skin (Leviticus 13:1–17)
2. in a boil (Leviticus 13:18–23) or burn (Leviticus 13:24–28)
3. bald patches or lesions of the scalp or beard (Leviticus 13:29–44), in which case the lesion is called a נתק (netek)

=== Skin patches ===
White patches of the skin are confirmed as tzaraath by the occurrence of one of three signs:

1. white hair (והיא הפכה שיער לבן) – if at least two hairs within the confines of the negah turn white
2. healthy flesh (ומחית בשר חי) – if skin of a normal appearance appears within the confines of the patch
3. spreading (ואם פשה תפשה המספחת בעור) – if the patch became enlarged since the time of the initial examination by the Kohen

Tzaraath skin patches can come in three varieties (Leviticus 13:2): se'et ("a rising" or "discoloration"), sapahat ("a gathering"), and baheret ("a bright spot"). The meaning of these terms is obscure, but they may suggest that tzaraat consists of an abnormal skin texture as well as color. However, rabbinic interpretation almost universally concluded that these three terms refer to different shades of color (white like wool or like snow, etc.) rather than different textures. The rabbis even argued the phrase "its appearance is deeper than the skin of his flesh" (Leviticus 13:3) refers to color ("deeper" presumed by the rabbis to mean "of lighter color"). As se'et and baheret (both terms which may refer to color and not texture) are later discussed individually (13:10, 13:4), while sapahat (apparently referring to texture) is not, sapahat may be considered a possible feature of se'et or baheret rather than an individual condition; in which case, the rabbinic interpretation may also be the original meaning of the verses.

Paradoxically, if the tzaraat covers a person's entire body, it is considered pure, and no isolation or purification ritual is needed. However, according to a minority interpretation, it is not the entire body, but the entire lesion (including any "islands" of previously healthy skin within the lesion) which must be covered by tzaraat in order to have this pure status.

=== Boils and burns ===
Boils and burns, as occur naturally as a result of an abscess, blunt force trauma or thermal insult to the skin, are not tzaraath and do not carry impurity. During the healing phases of these wounds, however, if certain signs that mimic those of the aforementioned patches appear, tzaraath may occur.

Confirmation is by the occurrence of one of two signs:

1. white hair (ושערה הפך לבן and נהפך שער לבן בבהרת) – similar to that in patches
2. spreading (ואם פשה תפשה בעור and אם פשה תפשה בעור) – similar to that in patches

=== Scalp or beard ===
The initial symptom of this type of tzaraath is patches of hair loss. According to Maimonides, scalp and beard tzaraath is characterized by hair loss without any change to the skin of the bald spot. The Tosefta, however, maintains that the skin of the bald spot becomes altered.

There are two confirming signs:

1. thin yellow hair (ובו שער צהב דק) – if at least two-and-a-half hairs from within the bald patch turn yellow (Leviticus 13:30)
2. spreading (והנה פשה הנתק בעור) – if the balding spreads, according to Maimonides. According to Abraham ben David, who quotes the Tosefta, this spreading would refer to spreading of a skin change as well (Leviticus 13:36).

While baldness is not a form of tzaraath, patches that occur on a bald scalp may be tzaraath if they meet the criteria mentioned by the Torah. Such an eruption on a bald scalp must appear in a distinct fashion, but is regulated by rules similar to that of tzaraath on the skin; however, it can only occur on men. For a scalp eruption to be tzaraath, the lesion must be a white patch tinged with red (נגע לבן אדמדם). This can occur in one of two places: within what are referred to as a man's posterior baldness (קרחת) and anterior baldness (גבחת).

=== Inspection and pronouncement ===
To determine whether a skin condition is indeed tzaraath, the afflicted individual must visit a kohen (a priest, possessing direct male lineage to Aaron). The kohen, trained in examining lesions and diagnosing tzaraath, examines the lesion according to the previously mentioned criteria, and determine whether it meets the specifications of tzaraath. If during the initial examination the lesion meets the criteria for tzaraath, the kohen pronounces the individual ritually impure (tamei, טמא).

If the criteria are not met by the lesion during the initial examination, the individual is confined to his home for seven days, pending a follow-up examination. If the criteria for tzaraath are again not met and the lesion has not spread, there is a difference in protocol depending on the type of lesion.

- For skin patches, another confinement period of seven days is imposed.
- For boils or burns, the kohen declares it merely a צרבת (tzarevet, "scar") and there are no further examinations.
- For bald patches or lesions of the scalp or beard, another confinement period of seven days is imposed. However, prior to this second confinement period, the individual is shaved around the lesion, but not in the lesion itself; according to the rabbis, a rim of two hairs surrounding the bald spot is left, to make any spreading recognizable.

After the second confinement period of seven days, those with skin patches or bald patches are re-evaluated once more. If the criteria for tzaraath have still not been met, the individual is declared pure. He or she, must, however, wash both his or her body and garments; due to the confinement, he or she is considered impure in some sense.

If the lesion was declared ritually pure and later it spread, it must be shown once again to a kohen, who will then pronounce it tzaraath.

If, however, the criteria for tzaraath have been met, either during the initial inspection or at either of the two follow-ups (when applicable) or even after a previous pronouncement of purity, the individual is declared impure. The individual is declared impure even if the lesion did not worsen or spread but remained the same—the skin eruption must become dimmer in appearance for it to be declared pure at the second follow-up examination.

The biblical emphasis appears to be on the ritual impurity that results from a diagnosis of tzaraath, not on any possible medical danger. The commands repeatedly discuss the sufferer's "pure" or "impure" status, only rarely mentioning "healing", and no Biblical story of tzaraath appears to involve the danger of death to the afflicted person.

=== Impure status ===
The individual who is declared impure with tzaraath is referred to as either a tzarua (צרוע) or a metzora (מצורע). Such individuals must live alone outside the confines of their community, and call out [ritually] impure, [ritually] impure. They must tear their garments, keep their hair unkept or uncut (פרוע), and cover their upper lip; these practices are expressions of mourning. In a different interpretation, the mouth must be covered, to prevent contagion.

A few medical historians, such as Arturo Castiglioni, regard this as the first model of sanitary legislation. Nevertheless, some (though not all) Talmudic laws treat tzaraath as noncontagious: non-Jewish victims of tzaraath were not considered ritually impure; in special circumstances (during a holy day, or for a bridegroom after his wedding) the kohen's inspection could be delayed until after the celebrations; in cases where white hair is a sign of tzaraat, if the white hairs were plucked before the inspection then the person was not declared impure. Similarly, in the Biblical description of house-tzaraath, individuals are encouraged to remove their belongings from the house before the house and its contents are pronounced impure.

=== Purification ritual ===
Once the metzora's lesion vanishes, he is evaluated by a kohen, who leaves the community to examine him. When the priest had certified that tzaraath had been cured, the biblical text requires that the formerly infected person (metzora) undergo a number of ritual events, some occurring immediately, and some occurring a week later.

Initially, the person took two kosher birds (ציפורים), cedar-wood, scarlet, and ezov. "Living" water was placed in an earthenware vessel, over which one of the birds was slaughtered and into which the blood was allowed to run. The kohen then dipped the remaining bird and other items into the bloodied water, and sprinkled it on the metzora seven times. The live bird was freed into the open field. The metzora washed their garments from impurity and shaved off all their hair.

The metzora then waited for seven days to begin the final steps of his purification ceremony; in this period he must avoid his own home, but may mix with other people. On the seventh day, he again washed his garments from impurity and again shaves off all of his hair, and was then deemed pure. On the eighth day, he brought three animal sacrifices to the sanctuary: a sin-offering of a female lamb, and a guilt-offering and a burnt-offering, both male lambs. One who could not afford this sacrifice would instead offer birds rather than lambs for the sin-offering and burnt-offering. Blood from the slaughtered guilt-offering was placed on his right ear, right thumb and right big toe; then some of the oil for the sacrifice was poured into the priest's left palm, and applied with the priest's right forefinger onto the metzora's right ear lobe, right thumb, and right big toe. The rest of the oil from the priest's palm was poured on the metzora 's head. Finally, the sin-offering and burnt-offering were sacrificed.

Some scholars speculate that the initial ritual may have originally been connected to sympathetic magic, with the living bird representing the departure of ritual impurity. Hyssop might simply be a good implement to use for sprinkling, with cedar-wood perhaps having alleged medicinal properties. Alternatively, tzaraath is seen as akin to death (Numbers 12:12), and the use of "living" water dyed with blood (representing life: Deut 12:23) and scarlet dye, along with cedar and ezov which also appear in the ceremony of purification from corpse-impurity (Numbers 19), represent the symbolic return of the metzora to life.

=== Stories involving tzaraat ===
The Hebrew Bible also speaks of tzaraath in several stories:

- In Exodus 4:1–7, when Moses stood before the burning bush, he doubted that the Israelites would believe that God had sent him. God provides him with two signs to prove his mission: turning his rod into a snake and then back into a rod, and turning his hand into being stricken with tzaraath and then back again. Moses performed these signs for the elders in Exodus 4:30.
- In Numbers 12:10, Miriam was stricken with tzaraath for her involvement in slandering Moses. Aaron asks Moses to cure her. Moses prays for his sister and she is cured of the tzaraath but must remain in confinement for seven days. The Torah, however, does not indicate that she went through any purification process similar to what is normally required. Miriam's tzaraath is described as "like snow", perhaps less due to the white color than due to the production of skin flakes, which is common in various skin diseases.
- Naaman, an Aramean general, suffered from tzaraath until being cured by Elisha. However, after Elisha's servant Gehazi defrauded Naaman, Gehazi and his descendants were punished with tzaraath.
- In 2 Kings 7, four men with tzaraath were staying outside the besieged city of Samaria, and were the first to discover that the besieging Aramean army had fled.
- King Uzziah was stricken with tzaraath after offering incense in the Temple, a task forbidden to all except the priests.

== Affliction of clothing ==
Tzaraath can also afflict garments. Garment tzaraath is relevant to only three materials:

1. wool (Hebrew צמר)
2. linen (Hebrew פשתים)
3. leather: either unworked leather (עור) or finished leather (כל מלאכת עור, literally "all worked leather")

In a wool or linen garment, the tzaraath may appear uniformly throughout the fabric, or else be limited to the garment's woof or to its warp (או בשתי או בערב).

Tzaraath appears in clothing as a greenish (ירקרק – yerakrak) or reddish (אדמדם – adamdam) eruption. This has been interpreted as either an intense color ("the greenest of greens") or a mild one ("less than fully green").

Such clothing must be brought to the kohen for inspection. A garment cannot be declared impure upon initial examination; rather, it is confined for seven days, and if on the seventh day, the eruption has spread, the garment is declared impure with tzaraath. Subsequent to a declaration of tzaraath, the garment, whether wool, linen or leather, is completely burnt in fire; if the tzaraath was confined to the woof or warp, only that need be burnt.

Upon re-evaluation after the seven-day confinement, the kohen may instruct that the garment with the eruption be washed and confined once more for seven days. If upon a second re-evaluation after the second seven days of confinement, the kohen sees that the eruption did not dim and did not spread, the garment is declared impure and must be completely burnt.

If the second re-evaluation reveals a dimming of the eruption, the kohen tears the area with the eruption from the garment and burns the torn out portion completely. The torn out area is patched to allow for a reinspection of the area for return of the lesion. If, the eruption returns to the patch, there is no confinement period instituted and the entire garment is completely burnt; if a lesion reappears on the garment but not on the patch, the garment must be burned but the patch can be saved. To recapitulate, if the lesion remained as it was after the first week of confinement, it is washed and reconfined. If it remained as it was after the second week of confinement, it is burned.

If, however, upon the second re-evaluation, the lesion disappears, the garment must be immersed in a mikveh (ritual bath) and is then pure.

Fabrics and clothing affected by tzaraath were required by the text to be burnt entirely, unless it was the form of tzaraath that faded after washing but came back after being torn out, in which case it could be considered ritually pure as soon as the tzaraath had gone, and it had subsequently been washed.

== Affliction of housing ==
The third and last type of tzaraath mentioned by the Torah affects buildings. If an individual notices an affliction on his house, he is to inform a kohen. The kohen will then command that they empty the house of all of its contents prior to his inspection; this is to prevent further financial loss, because should the house be confined, everything within it became impure as well.

When the kohen comes to perform the inspection, he looks for lesions on the wall that appear either intense green (ירקרקת) or intense red (אדמדמת) and that appear sunken below the plane of the wall's surface (שפל מן הקיר, literally "lower than the wall"). If this is what he sees, the kohen exits the house and confines it for seven days.

On the seventh day, upon re-evaluating the eruption, if the kohen sees that the eruption has spread beyond what it had been, the afflicted stones are removed, the area around the afflicted stones is scraped and both the removed stones and clay plaster are cast into a place of impurity.

The void is filled with new stones and clay plaster and the house is confined for another seven days. If upon a second re-evaluation, the negah has returned after new stones have been plastered in, the negah is deemed tzaraath and the entire house must be dismantled. If the negah does not return, the house is pronounced pure, and the same purification process mentioned in relation to tzaraath of human flesh is employed here.

Tzaraath infections in houses were to be treated similarly harshly according to the biblical regulations, and did not have any exceptions; stones showing the symptoms had to be removed, and the house had to be scraped, with the removed stones and scraped-off clay being cast into a rubbish heap outside the city, and if the infection returned once replacement stones were laid and daubed with clay, then the whole house had to be dismantled, with the rubble again going to the tip outside the city. Additionally, people who had been in a house while it was infected with tzaraath was considered ritually impure until the evening came, and anyone who had eaten or slept there had to also wash their clothes.

A house that was "healed" from tzaraat received a purification ritual virtually identical to that of a healed person, involving cedar-wood, scarlet, ezov, and two birds. However, the second half of the person's purification ritual, involving Temple sacrifices, was not performed.

== In Rabbinic Judaism ==
Rabbinic tradition includes an extensive elaboration of the tzaraath laws recorded in the Bible. The rabbinic laws of tzaraath appear in Mishnah tractate Nega'im.

=== Laws of skin ===
Rather than interpreting the biblical descriptions of tzaraath in the manner of modern doctors, classical rabbinical literature took an extremely literal view. This is shown in the following laws:

- In the group of symptoms where the hair of the inflicted region has turned white, the Mishnah argues that plucking out the white hair was all that was required for the disease not to be considered tzaraath.
- Since the biblical text mentions tzaraath occurring where boils had previously healed, but not where unhealed boils exist, the Mishnah maintains that the appearance of the other symptoms in an unhealed boil or burn do not indicate tzaraath, and that if the boil or burn subsequently heals, it still does not indicate tzaraath, unless the other symptoms occur in parts of the body not previously diseased.
- Sores smaller than the size of a lentil, those on the extremities of the body (such as the fingers, toes, ears, nose, breasts, etc.), and those that occur in hairy parts of the body, do not indicate tzaraath.

Rabbinic literature describes additional laws regarding priest's inspection of tzaraath:

- The kohen must be able to see the entirety of the lesion. Thus, if the skin eruption or bald spot wraps around either the body or body parts, or occurs at the tip of terminal body parts—any place that would preclude the observation of the entire lesion at one time (i.e. wrapping around the torso, scalp or arm, or occurring at the tip of a finger or toe) – there can be no declaration of tzaraath.
- In a similar vein, a kohen who is blind in one eye or who cannot see well may not perform the inspections. An eligible kohen may inspect anyone, including his relatives, except himself. Even a non-kohen may perform the inspection if they are proficient in the laws of nega'im, but only a kohen may declare purity or impurity. A non-kohen examiner may inform an accompanying inexpert kohen of his determination that a negah is or is not tzaraath and the kohen declares "purity" or "impurity".
- Nega'im do not render impurity on parts of the body that are naturally concealed by other parts of the body according to specific regulations. For skin eruptions on the legs, men are inspected standing as though they are hoeing and women standing as though they are rolling dough. For eruptions on the arms, men raise their arms as though they are picking olives and women raise their arms as though they are weaving or spinning.
- Nega'im do not render gentiles impure.
- A groom is exempt from visiting the kohen until the eighth day after his wedding for any nega'im on his flesh, garments or house. Similarly, there are no inspections carried out on the days of Passover, Shavuot or Sukkot.
- Even on the days when inspections are performed, they are only allowed for two hours each day: during the fourth and eighth hour of the day (corresponding roughly to 9–10 AM and 2–3 PM).

If someone cuts off some skin or a part of his body to remove a tzaraat lesion, he becomes impure, even if he had no confirming signs. He may become pure only after another lesion forms. The exception is when a lesion appears on the tip of the foreskin and is cut off during circumcision, which is permitted, because a positive commandment overrides a negative commandment.

Additional laws relate to the sacrifice offered at the metzora's recovery:

- The sprinkling was done onto the back of his hand, or else (according to another opinion) on his forehead.
- The slaughtered bird was buried in the presence of the metzora.
- When the recovered metzora is shaved, this shaving excludes places similar to those in which nega'im are not subject to impurity.
- The dabbing of sacrificial blood on the recovered metzora caused some complication, because the metzora was not allowed into Temple grounds prior to his purification process, while the blood of the offering was not allowed out of the Temple grounds. To reconcile this dilemma, the metzora stuck these body parts through the gateway one at a time to receive the blood. The same was done with the oil from the flour offerings of the metzora. If the metzora lost any of these body parts after he was ready for purification, he could never obtain purification.
- The remaining portion of the olive oil from the purification offering, called in Hebrew log shemen shel metzora, is retained by the kohen at the completion of his service. This portion is listed as one of the twenty-four kohanic gifts.

=== Laws of clothing ===
There are a number of limitations to tzaraath as it applies to clothing:

- Clothing belonging to a gentile are insusceptible to tzaraath.
- Only sheep's wool is susceptible to a negah of tzaraath, although an even mixture of sheep's wool and another type of wool (camel's wool, for example) can be afflicted. In a similar vein, a mixture of plant fibers containing linen is insusceptible unless it is at least half linen.
- The leather referred to by the Torah does not include the hides of marine animals.
- The fabric of wool or linen or leather article cannot be rendered impure by tzaraath if it is artificially dyed. If, however, the item is naturally colored (such as wool from a black sheep), it can be rendered impure.

=== Laws of houses ===
At least two afflicted stones are necessary for removal of any stones and at least two new stones must be used to fill the void. If the afflicted wall is shared by two houses owned by two neighbors, both neighbors must help to remove the afflicted stones, scrape and place the new stones, but only the owner of the house whose interior was afflicted performs the replastering. It is from this ruling that the proverb Oy l'rasha, oy l'scheino (אוי לרשע אוי לשכנו, "Woe to the wicked! Woe to his neighbor!") originates.

There are numerous limitations put on the tzaraath that afflicts houses:

- The house of a gentile is insusceptible to tzaraath.
- Only houses that possess four walls and four corners are susceptible. Similarly, only those houses that rest on the ground are susceptible, to the exclusion of those that are suspended above ground or are built on a boat.
- Tzaraath only affects houses that are built entirely out of stones, wood and clay plaster. If any of the four walls are built or internally overlaid with marble, natural outcropping of rock, brick or earthen soil, that wall is insusceptible to tzaraath, and a house cannot be rendered impure unless all four walls are susceptible.
- Two storey houses are treated as two distinct houses and the beams that serve as the floor of the upper storey and the roof of the lower storey are allowed to remain with whichever house remains.
- Houses are the only buildings that are susceptible to tzaraath (not, for example, barns or cattle stalls) and only houses that exist within the region of land originally divided among the 12 tribes, because the verse refers to beis eretz achuzaschem (בית ארץ אחזתכם, "a house of the land of your inheritance"); this also excludes houses in Jerusalem, because it was not given as an inheritance to any one tribe, but rather held jointly by all of Israel.

=== Interpretations ===
The Talmud, and most historic Jewish literature (for example Rabbi Samson Raphael Hirsch), regards tzaraath as a punishment for sin, and argue that cure from tzaraath only comes about through repentance and forgiveness. The verse itself arguably suggests this, as it directs those who find themselves afflicted to seek out a Kohen (priest) and not a doctor.

The Talmud lists seven possible causes for tzaraath: lashon hara ("evil tongue", i.e. malicious gossip), murder, a vain oath, illicit sexual intercourse, pride, theft, or miserly behavior. Elsewhere, the connection with gossip is supported by the wordplay metzora (leper) - motzi [shem] ra (slanderer), and by the example of Miriam who was punished with tzaraath after speaking negatively of Moses. (Note: See also Daniel 3:8 and 6:25, where "eating their piece [of flesh?]" is a metaphor meaning to "accuse them maliciously", paralleling tzaraat which is said to "eat one's flesh", and the possible similar usage in Psalms 27:2) One modern source asserts that as a "physical manifestation of a spiritual malaise", tzaraath is a "divine retribution for the offender's failure to feel the needs and share the hurt of others."

In particular, Midrash Rabbah sees the different types of tzaraath as increasing levels of punishment, which could be curtailed at any stage if repentance was made:

1. the first stage in the Rabbah's view was the infection of homes, and if repentance came here it only required removal of the affected stones for a cure.
2. in the second stage, the entire house must be torn down as the tzaraath would not go away, and the infection came upon one's clothes; if repentance came here it required only washing of the clothes for a cure.
3. in the third stage of Rabbah's scheme, the clothes must be burnt, and the infection enters the person's skin; if repentance occurs here then purification could occur.
4. in the fourth stage, which only occurs when the person has completely refused to repent, the person is forced to dwell alone.

Each Biblical victim of tzaraath is stated to have received the condition due to some violation of biblical laws, including Joab for the murder of Abner (whose blood was shed deceitfully in time of peace), Gehazi (for 1. rebelling against Elisha's decision to not take payment for a miracle God had worked 2. working deceitfully to take the payment 3. lying to Elisha, saying he had not done the thing); and Uzziah for burning incense in the Temple (a ritual whose performance was limited to priests).

Other classical rabbinical writers saw tzaraath of houses as having a practical benefit. According to one, as well as being a punishment for miserliness, it also demonstrated that the house owner was lying, if they had said they did not own certain objects neighbours had asked to borrow, since the biblical regulations require the house owner to take all their possessions outside prior to confinement. On the other hand, Rashi states that tzaraath of houses was a reward for the homeowner, arguing that the Israelite homes had previously been those of Canaanites, who had hidden their valuables in the walls; the tzaraath required the house owner to remove the bricks, and so find the treasures hidden there.

The items used in the purification ritual – birds, cedar wood, and worm – were specifically included to deliver a message to the metzora. The sin most associated with tzaraath is lashon hara; to speak derogatorily about others to one's friends is likened to birds, who chatter endlessly. Similarly, the one who speaks ill of others is haughty, holding himself or herself high above others, like the tall cedar. To be healed, the metzora must erase arrogance, making themselves lowly like a worm. This is a play on words—the word tola'as (תולעת) means both "red" and "worm" – as well as hyssop.

=== Current practice ===
The laws of tzaraath are not practiced by contemporary Jews. Several approaches have been suggested to explain why this is the case:

- One could contract tzaraath nowadays, but this is practically irrelevant, because in the absence of a Temple it is impossible to perform the tzaraath purification ritual, and because since the exile there is no commandment to remove tzaraath sufferers from the camp.
- One cannot formally acquire the status of tzaraath nowadays, since there are currently no priests with proven priestly lineage who can declare this status, or else because current priests do not have the necessary tradition or knowledge to determine the status, or because the Temple robes which must be worn while declaring the status are unavailable.
- In times of exile tzaraath is not regarded as a direct Divine punishment with a ritual remedy, but rather as a normal physical disease whose treatment is purely medical.

== Modern medical interpretations ==
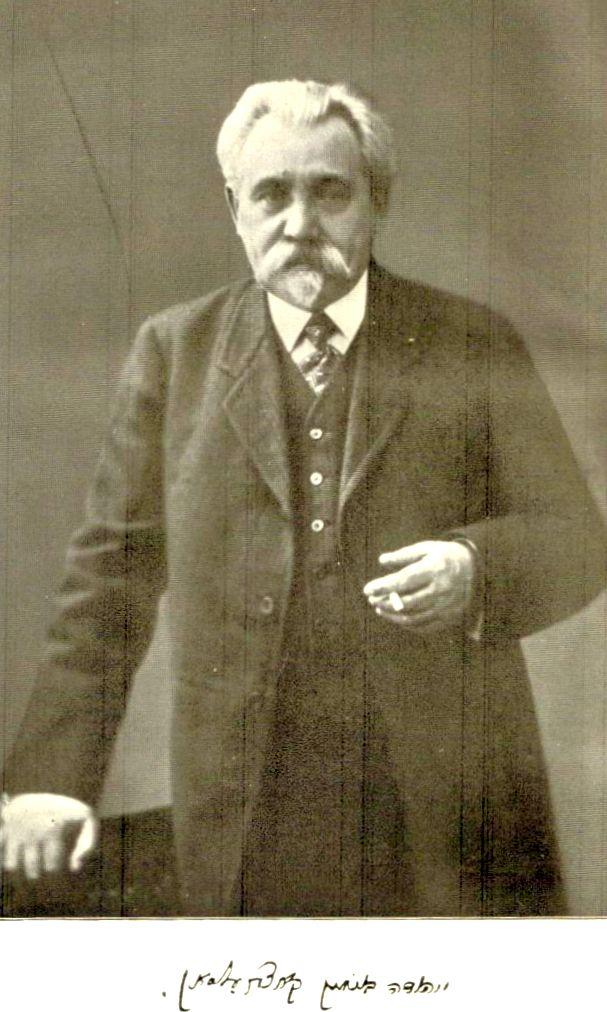
Ukrainian-Jewish born Yehuda L. Katzenelson (1846–1917) devoted a portion of his work on talmudic medicine to the analysis of the parallels between vitiligo and biblical tzaraath. He concluded that the chazalic consensus was that they are synonymous.

=== Tzaraath of the skin ===
Scholars suspect that the descriptions of tzaraath of the skin actually refer to a number of different skin diseases, which, owing to the undeveloped state of medical science at that period, were not distinguished. A wide range of diseases, infections, and skin conditions known to modern medicine have been suggested as differential diagnosis of tzaraath, including psoriasis, seborrhoeic dermatitis, favid, dermatophyte infections, nummular dermatitis, atopic dermatitis, pityriasis rosea, crusted scabies, syphilis, impetigo, sycosis barbae, alopecia areata, boil, scabies, lichen simplex chronicus, scarlet fever, lupus erythematosus, lichen sclerosus et atrophicus, folliculitis decalvans, morphea, sarcoidosis, and lichen planopilaris.

Of the particular situations that Leviticus describes as being tzaraath,

- the whitening of the skin over the whole body with sores, is considered by scholars to be most indicative of psoriasis
- the spreading of sores is regarded by scholars as most symptomatic of impetigo
- the spreading of swellings or spots in a burn injury, according to scholars, is most probably a result of erysipelas
- in regard to subcutaneous disease where the hair has turned white
  - the additional presence of swellings or spots in a burn injury are thought by scholars most likely to be tropical sores
  - the additional presence of bodily sores, and swellings or spots where there previously had been a boil, is one of the classical symptoms of leprosy
  - the additional presence of sores on the head or chin is thought by scholars to most probably indicate the presence of ringworm
- a white spot in the head or beard hair, called a netek, may be favus.

Russian pathologist Gregory Minh discovered that leprosy is contagious; assuming that biblical tzaraat is non-contagious, he therefore concluded that tzaraath is in fact vitiligo. Similarly, Reuven Kalisher suggested that vitiligo is the most likely candidate for biblical tzaraath, as it is non-contagious, causes the hair located within the discolored area to turn white (also known as poliosis or leukotrichia), and can grow in size within a week to two-week period. Yehuda L. Katzenelson added that while vitiligo lacks the safachat characteristic of biblical tzaraat, the Mishna (Negaim, chapter 1) also does not mention this characteristic. However Katzenelson concluded his analysis by listing many unanswered difficulties with Minh's opinion.

One recent author suggests that tzaraath in fact corresponds to no naturally occurring disease: "By establishing rigid criteria, almost everyone who was examined was destined to fail to meet the criteria for diagnosis. Therefore this passage was designed to integrate persons with disfiguring skin diseases back into society, not to excommunicate them as was the practice in neighbouring societies."

=== Similar conditions not considered tzaraath ===
In addition to simple rashes, inflammations, and swellings, the biblical text mentions a number of other conditions that could be confused with tzaraath. Among other situations the text considers harmless are the appearance of dull white spots, white patches of skin without sores, and baldness without sores; the latter two of these are thought by scholars to most probably refer to vitiligo and alopecia, respectively, and the Bible remarks that the former – the dull white spots – are merely a form of freckles. The symptoms that the text considers to be indicative of disease include those of the spread of superficial swellings or spots (where there had previously been a boil), and those of reddish-white sores in areas of baldness; the former condition is identified by the Bible as plague, and scholars regard its symptoms as pointing to a diagnosis of smallpox, while the latter is unidentified in the biblical text, but considered by scholars to indicate favus.

=== In clothing fabrics ===
In addition to infecting the skin, tzaraath is described by Leviticus as being able to infect historically common clothing fabrics, specifically wool, linen, and leather. The biblical description of tzaraath in such fabrics is strikingly analogous to that of tzaraath in the skin, with, for example, spreading of the infection being tested for by isolating the fabric in question for first 7 days. The principal symptoms are described as being green or red spots, which spread within a week, or that do not change appearance at all after a fortnight, having been washed after the first week, or that return a week after having been torn out, if they also had faded with washing prior to being torn out. These descriptions are regarded by scholars as most probably indicative of certain moulds, and especially matching infections by Penicillium (the fungus that produces penicillin).

=== In houses ===
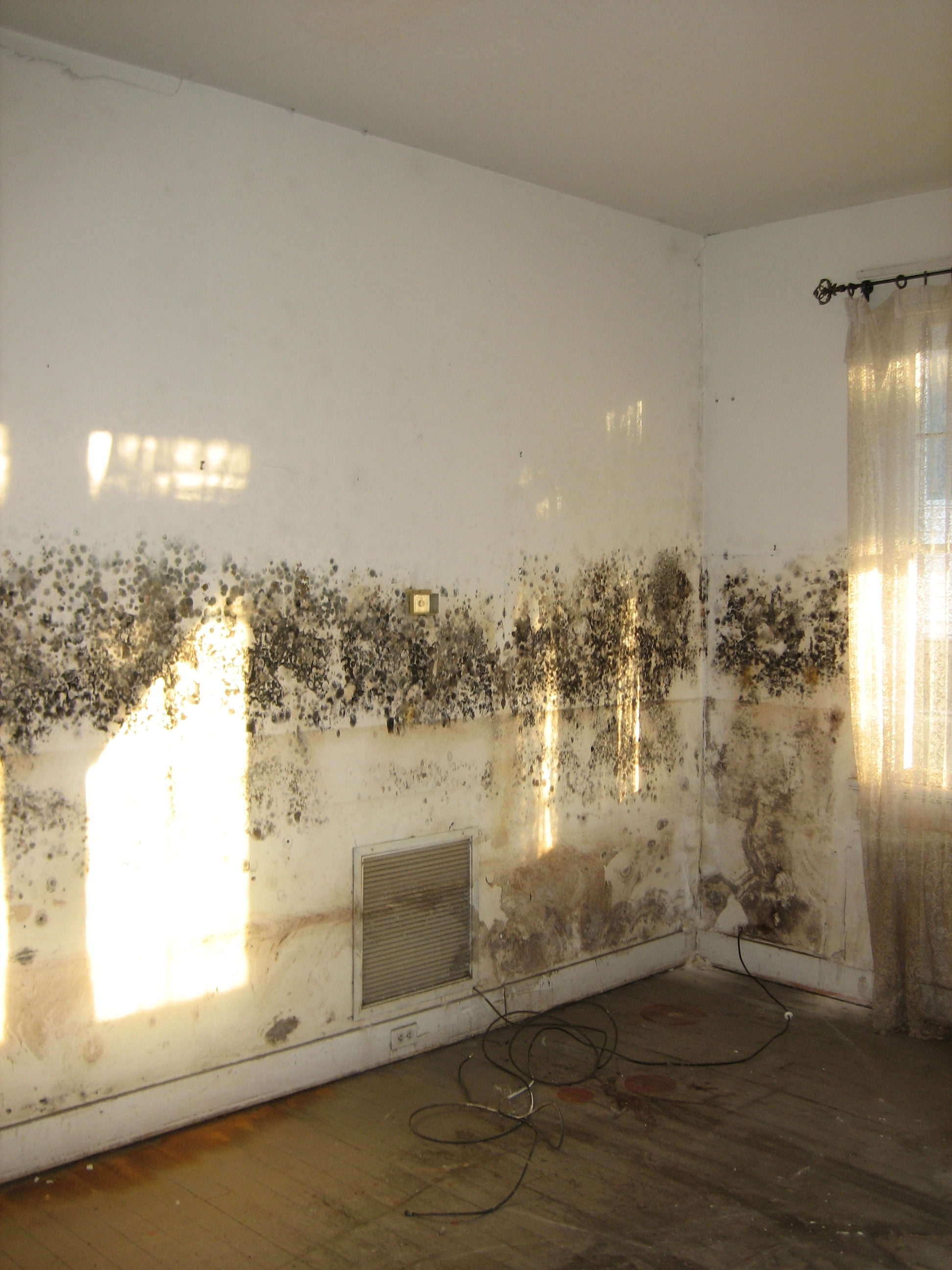
Mildew infecting a flat

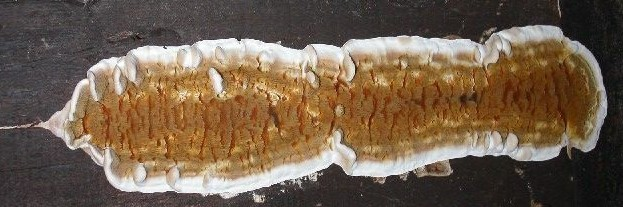
Dry rot

The biblical text also describes tzaraath as infecting the walls of houses; the symptoms it describes are depressions in the wall, which are green or red, and spread over a period of seven days. The description is regarded by scholars as again being strikingly similar to the wording of the description of tzaraath infections in the skin, but still somewhat obscure; it would seem to fit some form of fungal growth, especially dry rot, which produces yellowish-green and reddish patches on walls.
