= Nega'im =

Tractate of the Talmud

Neghaʿim (Hebrew: נגעים, "Blemishes") is the third tractate of the order of Tohorot in the Mishnah. It consists of fourteen chapters. Nega'im describes the various forms of tzaraath, a leprosy-like disease described in the Parshiyot of Tazria and Metzora in the Torah, which affected people, clothing, and homes. The tractate describes the different types of blemishes symptomatic of the disease, and the various rituals involved in purifying someone who has been affected by it.

This tractate, along with Oholot, was considered one of the most difficult tractates; according to a Jewish legend, King David is said to have asked of God that reading the Book of Psalms be considered the equivalent of studying the tractate of Negaim and Oholot.

There is no Gemara for Nega'im in either the Babylonian or Jerusalem Talmud.
