= Tazria =

27th weekly Torah portion

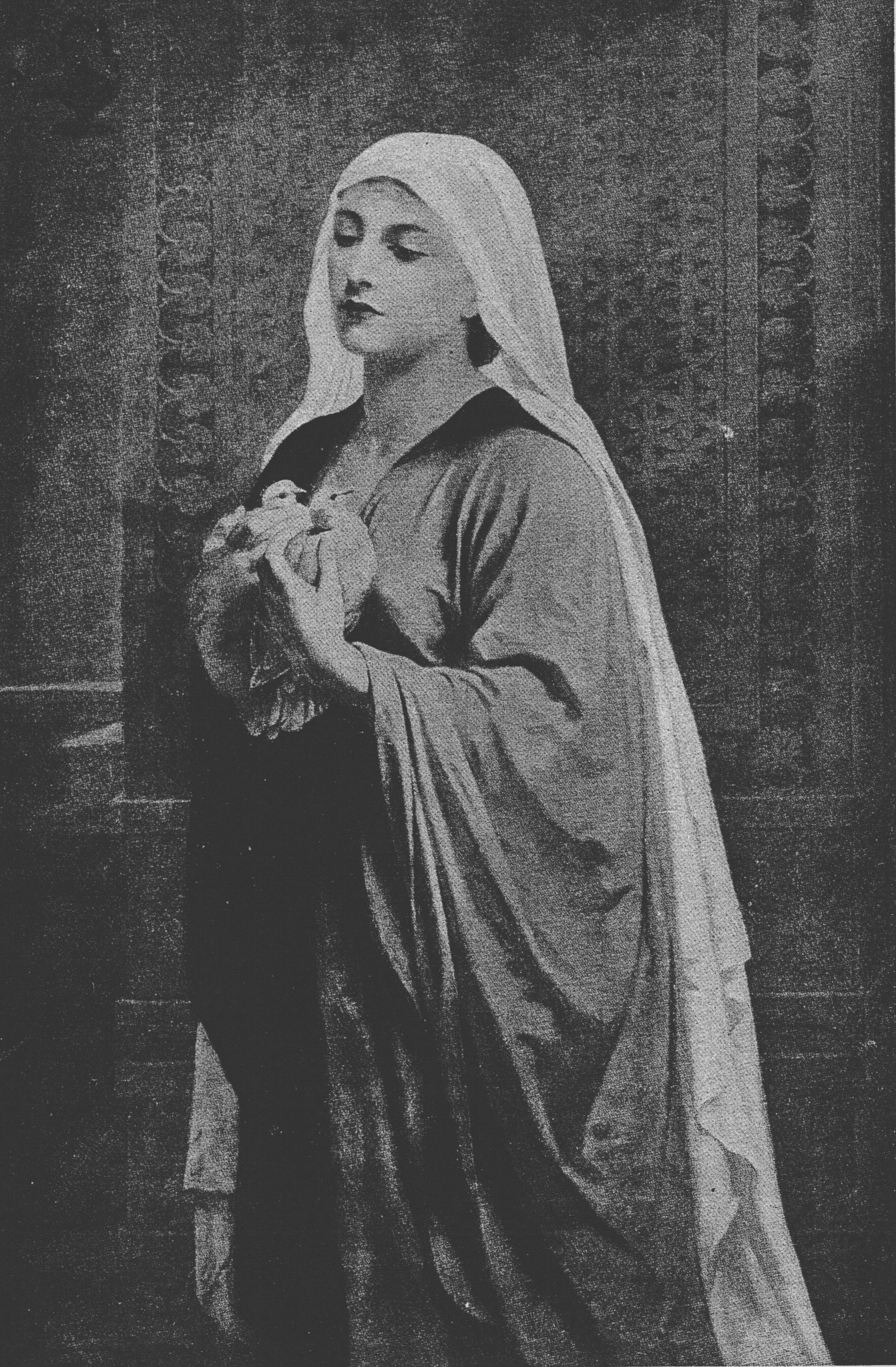
The Poor Widow's Offering (illustration by Frederick Goodall)

Tazria, Thazria, Thazri'a, Sazria, or Ki Tazria' (Hebrew: תַזְרִיעַ, '[she] conceives', is the 13th word—and the first distinctive word—in the parashah, wherein the root word זֶרַע means "seed") is the 27th weekly Torah portion (פָּרָשָׁה, parashah) in the annual Jewish cycle of Torah reading and the fourth in the Book of Leviticus. The parashah deals with ritual impurity. It constitutes Leviticus 12:1–13:59. The parashah is made up of 3,667 Hebrew letters, 1,010 Hebrew words, 67 verses, and 128 lines in a Torah Scroll (סֵפֶר תּוֹרָה, sefer Torah).

Jews read it the 27th or 28th Shabbat after Simchat Torah, generally in April or, rarely, in late March or early May. The lunisolar Hebrew calendar contains up to 55 weeks, the exact number varying between 50 in common years and 54 or 55 in leap years. In leap years (e.g., 2024 and 2027), parashat Tazria is read independently. In common years (e.g., 2025, 2026, and 2028), parashat Tazria is combined with the parashah following it, Metzora, to help achieve the number of weekly readings needed.

== Readings ==
In traditional Sabbath Torah reading, the parashah is divided into seven readings, or עליות, aliyot.

=== First reading—Leviticus 12:1–13:5 ===
In the first reading, God told Moses to tell the Israelites that when a woman at childbirth bore a boy, she was to be unclean 7 days and then remain in a state of blood purification for 33 days, while if she bore a girl, she was to be unclean 14 days and then remain in a state of blood purification for 66 days. Upon completing her period of purification, she was to bring a lamb for a burnt offering and a pigeon or a turtle dove for a sin offering, and the priest was to offer them as sacrifices to make expiation on her behalf. If she could not afford a sheep, she was to take two turtle doves or two pigeons, one for a burnt offering and the other for a sin offering. God told Moses and Aaron that when a person had a swelling, rash, discoloration, scaly affection, inflammation, or burn, it was to be reported to the priest, who was to examine its colour and depth to determine whether the person was clean or unclean.

=== Second reading—Leviticus 13:6–17 ===
In the second reading, the priest was to examine the person again on the seventh day to determine whether the person was clean or unclean. The reading goes on to describe the features of skin disease.

=== Third reading—Leviticus 13:18–23 ===
The third reading further describes features of skin disease.

=== Fourth reading—Leviticus 13:24–28 ===
The fourth reading further describes features of skin disease.

=== Fifth reading—Leviticus 13:29–39 ===
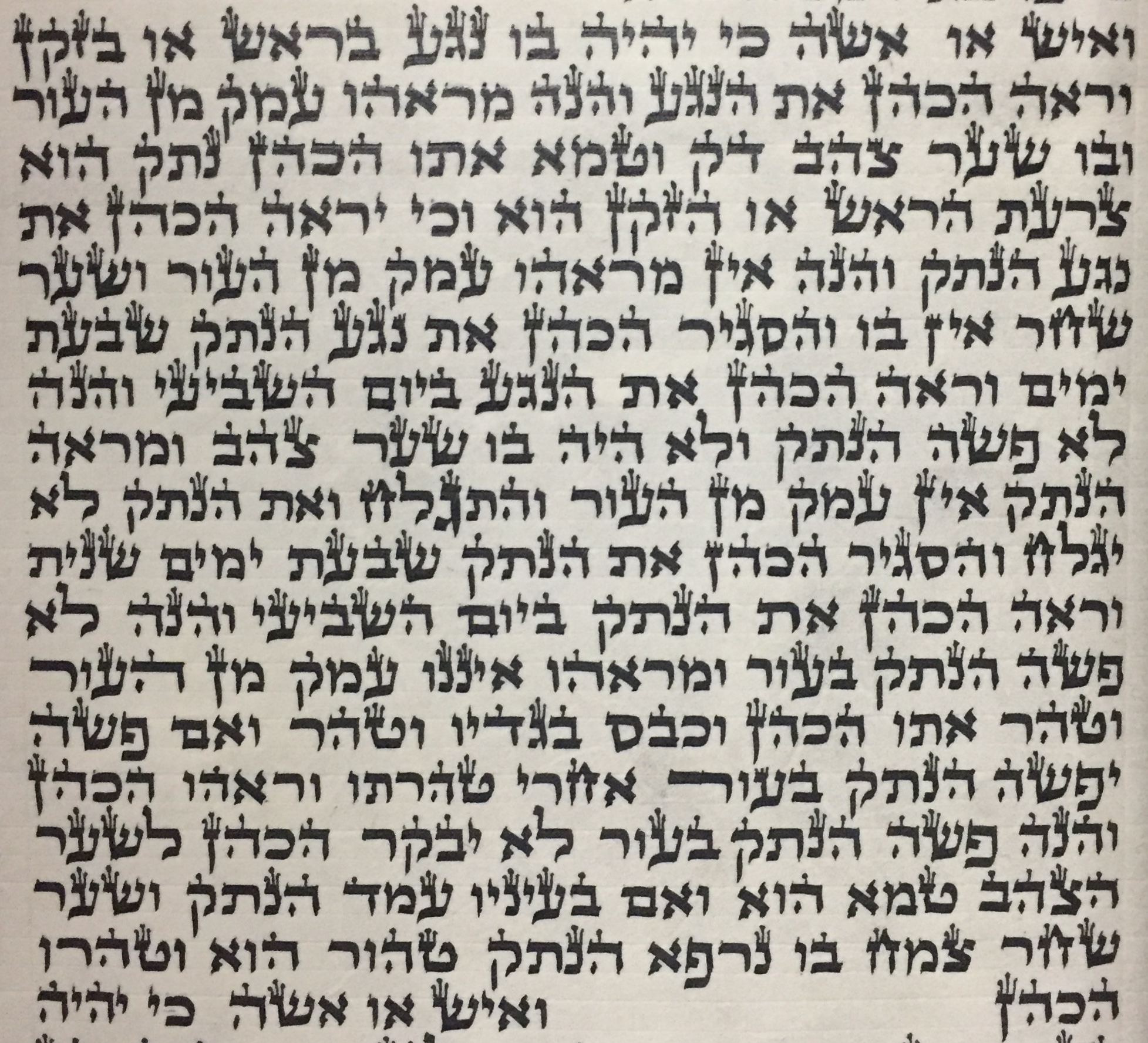
The word וְהִתְגַּלָּח in Leviticus 13:33 is spelled with a large gimel.

The fifth reading describes features of skin disease on the head or beard.

=== Sixth reading—Leviticus 13:40–54 ===
The sixth reading continued the discussion of skin disease on the head or beard. Unclean persons were to rend their clothes, leave their head bare, cover over their upper lips, call out, "Unclean! Unclean!" and dwell outside the camp. When a streaky green or red eruptive affection occurred in wool, linen, or animal skin, it was to be shown to the priest, who was to examine it to determine whether it was clean or unclean. If unclean, it was to be burned.

=== Seventh reading—Leviticus 13:55–59 ===
In the seventh reading, if the affliction disappeared from the article upon washing, it was to be shut up seven days, washed again, and be clean.

=== Readings according to the triennial cycle ===
Jews who read the Torah according to the triennial cycle of Torah reading may read the parashah according to a different schedule.

== In inner-biblical interpretation ==
The parashah has parallels or is discussed in these Biblical sources:

=== Leviticus chapter 12 ===
Leviticus 12 associates childbirth with uncleanness. In the Hebrew Bible, uncleanness has a variety of associations. Leviticus 11:8, 11; 21:1–4, 11; and Numbers 6:6–7; and 19:11–16; associate it with death. And perhaps similarly, Leviticus 13–14 associates it with skin disease. Leviticus 15 associates it with various sexuality-related events. And Jeremiah 2:7, 23; 3:2; 7:30; and Hosea 6:10 associate it with contact with the worship of alien gods.

While Leviticus 12:6–8 required a new mother to bring a burnt-offering and a sin-offering, Leviticus 26:9, Deuteronomy 28:11, and Psalm 127:3–5 make clear that having children is a blessing from God; Genesis 15:2 and 1 Samuel 1:5–11 characterize childlessness as a misfortune; and Leviticus 20:20 and Deuteronomy 28:18 threaten childlessness as a punishment.

=== Leviticus chapter 13 ===
The Hebrew Bible reports skin disease (צָּרַעַת, tzara'at) and a person affected by skin disease (metzora, מְּצֹרָע) at several places, often (and sometimes incorrectly) translated as "leprosy" and "a leper." In Exodus 4:6, to help Moses to convince others that God had sent him, God instructed Moses to put his hand into his bosom, and when he took it out, his hand was "leprous (m'tzora'at, מְצֹרַעַת), as white as snow." In Leviticus 13–14, the Torah sets out regulations for skin disease (צָּרַעַת, tzara'at) and a person affected by skin disease (metzora, מְּצֹרָע). In Numbers 12:10, after Miriam spoke against Moses, God's cloud removed from the Tent of Meeting and "Miriam was leprous (m'tzora'at, מְצֹרַעַת), as white as snow." In Deuteronomy 24:8–9, Moses warned the Israelites in the case of skin disease (צָּרַעַת, tzara'at) diligently to observe all that the priests would teach them, remembering what God did to Miriam. In 2 Kings 5:1–19, part of the haftarah for Parashat Tazria, the prophet Elisha cures Naaman, the commander of the army of the king of Aram, who was a "leper" (metzora, מְּצֹרָע). In 2 Kings 7:3–20, part of the haftarah for Parashat Metzora, the story is told of four "leprous men" (m'tzora'im, מְצֹרָעִים) at the gate during the Arameans' siege of Samaria. And in 2 Chronicles 26:19, after King Uzziah tried to burn incense in the Temple in Jerusalem, "leprosy (צָּרַעַת, tzara'at) broke forth on his forehead."

== In early nonrabbinic interpretation ==
The parashah has parallels or is discussed in these early nonrabbinic sources:

=== Leviticus chapter 13 ===
Philo taught that the skin disease in Leviticus 13 signified voluntary depravity.

== In classical rabbinic interpretation ==
The parashah is discussed in these rabbinic sources from the era of the Mishnah and the Talmud:

=== Leviticus chapter 12 ===
Rabbi Simlai noted that just as God created humans after creating cattle, beasts, and birds, the law concerning human impurity in Leviticus 12 follows that concerning cattle, beasts, and birds in Leviticus 11.

Reading Leviticus 12:2, "If a woman conceives," Rabbi Levi said three things: It is only natural that if a person has given into another's keeping an ounce of silver in private, and the latter returns a pound of gold in public, the former will surely be grateful to the latter; and so is it with God. Human beings entrust to God a drop of fluid in privacy, and God openly returns to them completed and perfected human beings. Rabbi Levi said a second thing: It is natural that, if a person is confined without attention to a chamber, and someone comes and kindles a light for the person there, the former should feel gratitude towards the latter. So too is it with God. When the embryo is in its mother's womb, God causes a light to shine for it there with which it can see from one end of the world to the other. Rabbi Levi said a third thing: It is natural that, if a person is confined without attention to a chamber, and someone comes and releases the person and takes the person out from there, the former should feel gratitude to the latter. Even so, when the embryo is in its mother's womb, God comes and releases it and brings it forth into the world.

Rabbi Ammi taught in the name of Rabbi Joḥanan that even though Rabbi Simeon ruled that a dissolved fetus expelled by a woman was not unclean, Rabbi Simeon nonetheless agreed that the woman was ritually unclean as a woman who bore a child. An old man explained to Rabbi Ammi that Rabbi Joḥanan reasoned from the words of Leviticus 12:2, "If a woman conceived seed and bore." Those words imply that even if a woman bore something like "conceived seed" (in a fluid state), she was nonetheless unclean by reason of childbirth.

Rabbi Joḥanan interpreted the words "in the [eighth] day" in Leviticus 12:3 to teach that one must perform circumcision even on the Sabbath.

The Gemara read the command of Genesis 17:14 to require an uncircumcised adult man to become circumcised, and the Gemara read the command of Leviticus 12:3 to require the father to circumcise his infant child.

The Mishnah taught that circumcision should not be performed until the sun has risen, but counts it as done if done after dawn has appeared. The Gemara explained that the reason for the rule could be found in the words of Leviticus 12:3, "And in the eighth day the flesh of his foreskin shall be circumcised." A baraita interpreted Leviticus 12:3 to teach that the whole eighth day is valid for circumcision, but deduced from Abraham's rising "early in the morning" to perform his obligations in Genesis 22:3 that the zealous perform circumcisions early in the morning.

The disciples of Rabbi Simeon ben Yoḥai asked him why Leviticus 12:6–8 ordained that after childbirth a woman had to bring a sacrifice. He replied that when she bore her child, she swore impetuously in the pain of childbirth that she would never again have intercourse with her husband. The Torah, therefore, ordained that she had to bring a sacrifice, as she would probably violate that oath. Rabbi Berekiah and Rabbi Simon said in the name of Rabbi Simeon ben Yoḥai that because she fluttered in her heart, she had to bring a fluttering sacrifice, two turtle-doves or two young pigeons. The disciples asked Rabbi Simeon ben Yoḥai why Leviticus 12:2 permitted contact between the father and mother after 7 days when the mother bore a boy, but Leviticus 12:5 permitted contact after 14 days when she bore a girl. He replied that since everyone around the mother would rejoice upon the birth of a boy, she would regret her oath to shun her husband after just 7 days, but since people around her would not rejoice on the birth of a girl, she would take twice as long. And Rabbi Simeon ben Yoḥai taught that Leviticus 12:3 ordained circumcision on the eighth day so that the parents could join their guests in a celebratory mood on that day.

Leviticus 5:7; 5:11; 12:8; and 14:21–22 provided that people of lesser means could bring less-expensive offerings. The Mishnah taught that one who sacrificed much and one who sacrificed little attained equal merit, so long as they directed their hearts to Heaven. Rabbi Zera taught that Ecclesiastes 5:11 provided a Scriptural proof for this when it says, "Sweet is the sleep of a serving man, whether he eat little or much." Rav Adda bar Ahavah taught that Ecclesiastes 5:10 provided a Scriptural proof for this when it says, "When goods increase, they are increased who eat them; and what advantage is there to the owner thereof." Rabbi Simeon ben Azzai taught that Scripture says of a large ox, "An offering made by fire of a sweet savor"; of a small bird, "An offering made by fire of a sweet savor"; and of a meal-offering, "An offering made by fire of a sweet savor." Rabbi Simeon ben Azzai thus taught that Scripture uses the same expression each time to teach that it is the same whether people offered much or little, so long as they directed their hearts to Heaven. And Rabbi Isaac asked why the meal-offering was distinguished in that Leviticus 2:1 uses the word "soul" (נֶפֶשׁ, nefesh) to refer to the donor of a meal-offering, instead of the usual "man" (אָדָם, adam, in Leviticus 1:2, or אִישׁ, ish, in Leviticus 7:8) used in connection with other sacrifices. Rabbi Isaac taught that Leviticus 2:1 uses the word "soul" (נֶפֶשׁ, nefesh) because God noted that the one who usually brought a meal-offering was a poor man, and God accounted it as if the poor man had offered his own soul.

Rabbi Simeon noted that Scripture always lists turtledoves before pigeons and imagined that one might thus think that Scripture prefers turtledoves over pigeons. But Rabbi Simeon quoted the instructions of Leviticus 12:8, "a young pigeon or a turtledove for a sin-offering," to teach that Scripture accepted both equally.

Rabbi Eleazar ben Ḥisma taught that even the apparently arcane laws of bird offerings in Leviticus 12:8 and the beginning of menstrual cycles in Leviticus 12:1–8 are essential laws.

Tractate Kinnim in the Mishnah interpreted the laws of pairs of sacrificial pigeons and doves in Leviticus 1:14, 5:7, 12:6–8, 14:22, and 15:29; and Numbers 6:10.

Interpreting the beginning of menstrual cycles, as in Leviticus 12:6–8, the Mishnah ruled that if a woman loses track of her menstrual cycle, there is no return to the beginning of the niddah count in fewer than seven, nor more than seventeen days.

The Mishnah (following Leviticus 5:7–8) taught that a sin-offering of a bird preceded a burnt-offering of a bird; and the priest also dedicated them in that order. Rabbi Eliezer taught that wherever an offerer (because of poverty) substituted for an animal sin-offering the offering of two birds (one of which was for a sin-offering and the other for a burnt-offering), the priest sacrificed the bird sin-offering before the bird burnt-offering (as Leviticus 5:7–8 instructs). But in the case of a woman after childbirth discussed in Leviticus 12:8 (where a poor new mother could substitute for an animal burnt-offering two birds, one for a sin-offering and the other for a burnt-offering), the bird burnt-offering took precedence over the bird sin-offering. Wherever the offering came on account of sin, the sin-offering took precedence. But here (in the case of a woman after childbirth, where the sin-offering was not on account of sin) the burnt-offering took precedence. And wherever both birds came instead of one animal sin-offering, the sin-offering took precedence. But here (in the case of a woman after childbirth) they did not both come on account of a sin-offering (for in poverty she substituted a bird burnt-offering for an animal burnt-offering, as Leviticus 12:6–7 required her to bring a bird sin-offering in any case), the burnt-offering took precedence. (The Gemara asked whether this contradicted the Mishnah, which taught that a bird sin-offering took precedence over an animal burnt-offering, whereas here she brought the animal burnt-offering before the bird sin-offering.) Rava taught that Leviticus 12:6–7 merely accorded the bird burnt-offering precedence in the mentioning. (Thus, some read Rava to teach that Leviticus 12:6–8 lets the reader read first about the burnt-offering, but in fact the priest sacrificed the sin-offering first. Others read Rava to teach that one first dedicated the animal or bird for the burnt-offering and then dedicated the bird for the sin-offering, but in fact the priest sacrificed the sin-offering first.)

Leviticus 12:8 called for "two turtle-doves, or two young pigeons: the one for a burnt-offering, and the other for a sin-offering." Rav Ḥisda taught that the designation of one of the birds to become the burnt-offering and the other to become the sin-offering was made either by the owner or by the priest's action. Rabbi Shimi bar Ashi explained that the words of Leviticus 12:8, "she shall take ... the one for a burnt-offering, and the other for a sin-offering," indicated that the mother could have made the designation when taking the birds, and the words of Leviticus 15:15, "the priest shall offer them, the one for a sin-offering, and the other for a burnt-offering," and of Leviticus 15:30, "the priest shall offer the one for a sin-offering, and the other for a burnt-offering," indicated that (absent such a designation by the mother) the priest could have made the designation when offering them up.

=== Leviticus chapter 13 ===
Reading Leviticus 13:1, a midrash taught that in 18 verses, Scripture places Moses and Aaron (the instruments of Israel's deliverance) on an equal footing (reporting that God spoke to both of them alike), and thus there are 18 benedictions in the Amidah.

Tractate Negaim in the Mishnah and Tosefta interpreted the laws of skin disease in Leviticus 13.

A midrash compared the discussion of skin diseases beginning at Leviticus 13:2 to the case of a noble lady who, upon entering the king's palace, was terrified by the whips that she saw hanging about. But the king told her: "Do not fear; these are meant for the slaves, but you are here to eat, drink, and make merry." So, too, when the Israelites heard the section of Scripture dealing with leprous affections, they became afraid. But Moses told them: "These are meant for the wicked nations, but you are intended to eat, drink, and be joyful, as it is written in Psalm 32:10: "Many are the sufferings of the wicked; but he that trusts in the Lord, mercy surrounds him."

Rabbi Joḥanan said in the name of Rabbi Joseph ben Zimra that anyone who bears evil tales (לשון הרע, lashon hara) will be visited by the plague of skin disease (צָּרַעַת, tzara'at), as it is said in Psalm 101:5: "Whoever slanders his neighbor in secret, him will I destroy (azmit)." The Gemara read azmit to allude to צָּרַעַת, tzara'at, and cited how Leviticus 25:23 says "in perpetuity" (la-zemitut). And Resh Lakish interpreted the words of Leviticus 14:2, "This shall be the law of the person with skin disease (metzora)," to mean, "This shall be the law for him who brings up an evil name (motzi shem ra)." And the Gemara reported that in the Land of Israel they taught that slander kills three persons: the slanderer, the one who accepts it, and the one about whom the slander is told.

Similarly, Rabbi Haninah taught that skin disease came only from slander. The Rabbis found a proof for this from the case of Miriam, arguing that because she uttered slander against Moses, plagues attacked her. And the Rabbis read Deuteronomy 24:8–9 to support this when it says in connection with skin disease, "remember what the Lord your God did to Miriam."

Rabbi Samuel bar Naḥmani said in the name of Rabbi Joḥanan that skin disease results from seven sins: slander, the shedding of blood, vain oath, incest, arrogance, robbery, and envy. The Gemara cited Scriptural bases for each of the associations: For slander, Psalm 101:5; for bloodshed, 2 Samuel 3:29; for a vain oath, 2 Kings 5:23–27; for incest, Genesis 12:17; for arrogance, 2 Chronicles 26:16–19; for robbery, Leviticus 14:36 (as a Tanna taught that those who collect money that does not belong to them will see a priest come and scatter their money around the street); and for envy, Leviticus 14:35.

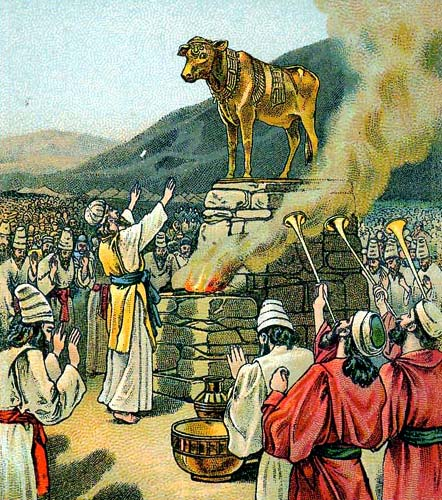
Worshiping the golden calf (illustration from a 1901 Bible card published by the Providence Lithograph Company)

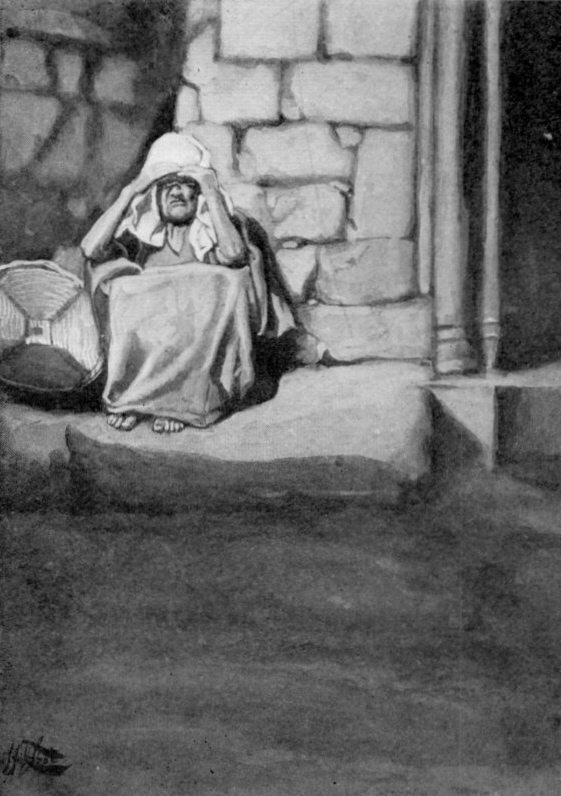
Miriam Shut Out from the Camp (watercolor circa 1896–1902 by James Tissot)

Similarly, a midrash taught that skin disease resulted from 10 sins: (1) idol-worship, (2) unchastity, (3) bloodshed, (4) the profanation of the Divine Name, (5) blasphemy of the Divine Name, (6) robbing the public, (7) usurping a dignity to which one has no right, (8) overweening pride, (9) evil speech, and (10) an evil eye. The midrash cited as proofs: (1) for idol-worship, the experience of the Israelites who said of the Golden Calf, "This is your god, O Israel," in Exodus 32:4 and then were smitten with leprosy, as reported in Exodus 32:25, where "Moses saw that the people had broken out (parua, פָרֻעַ)," indicating that leprosy had "broken out" (parah) among them; (2) for unchastity, from the experience of the daughters of Zion of whom Isaiah 3:16 says, "the daughters of Zion are haughty, and walk with stretched-forth necks and ogling eyes," and then Isaiah 3:17 says, "Therefore will the Lord smite with a scab the crown of the head of the daughters of Zion"; (3) for bloodshed, from the experience of Joab, of whom 2 Samuel 3:29 says, "Let it fall upon the head of Joab, and upon all his father's house; and let there not fail from the house of Joab one that hath an issue, or that is a leper," (4) for the profanation of the Divine Name, from the experience of Gehazi, of whom 2 Kings 5:20 says, "But Gehazi, the servant of Elisha the man of God, said: 'Behold, my master has spared this Naaman the Aramean, in not receiving at his hands that which he brought; as the Lord lives, I will surely run after him, and take of him somewhat (me'umah, מְאוּמָה)," and "somewhat" (me'umah, מְאוּמָה) means "of the blemish" (mum, מוּם) that Naaman had, and thus Gehazi was smitten with leprosy, as 2 Kings 5:20 reports Elisha said to Gehazi, "The leprosy therefore of Naaman shall cleave to you"; (5) for blaspheming the Divine Name, from the experience of Goliath, of whom 1 Samuel 17:43 says, "And the Philistine cursed David by his God," and the 1 Samuel 17:46 says, "This day will the Lord deliver (sagar, סַגֶּרְ) you," and the term "deliver" (sagar, סַגֶּרְ) is used here in the same sense as Leviticus 13:5 uses it with regard to leprosy, when it says, "And the priest shall shut him up (sagar)"; (6) for robbing the public, from the experience of Shebna, who derived illicit personal benefit from property of the Sanctuary, and of whom Isaiah|22:17 says, "the Lord ... will wrap you round and round," and "wrap" must refer to a leper, of whom Leviticus 13:45 says, "And he shall wrap himself over the upper lip"; (7) for usurping a dignity to which one has no right, from the experience of Uzziah, of whom 2 Chronicles 26:21 says, "And Uzziah the king was a leper to the day of his death"; (8) for overweening pride, from the same example of Uzziah, of whom 2 Chronicles 26:16 says, "But when he became strong, his heart was lifted up, so that he did corruptly and he trespassed against the Lord his God"; (9) for evil speech, from the experience of Miriam, of whom Numbers 12:1 says, "And Miriam ... spoke against Moses," and then Numbers 12:10 says, "when the cloud was removed from over the Tent, behold Miriam was leprous"; and (10) for an evil eye, from the person described in Leviticus 14:35, which can be read, "And he that keeps his house to himself shall come to the priest, saying: There seems to me to be a plague in the house," and Leviticus 14:35 thus describes one who is not willing to permit any other to have any benefit from the house.

Similarly, Rabbi Judah the Levite, son of Rabbi Shalom, inferred that skin disease comes because of eleven sins: (1) for cursing the Divine Name, (2) for immorality, (3) for bloodshed, (4) for ascribing to another a fault that is not in him, (5) for haughtiness, (6) for encroaching upon other people's domains, (7) for a lying tongue, (8) for theft, (9) for swearing falsely, (10) for profanation of the name of Heaven, and (11) for idolatry. Rabbi Isaac added: for ill-will. And our Rabbis said: for despising the words of the Torah.

Reading Leviticus 18:4, "My ordinances (מִשְׁפָּטַי, mishpatai) shall you do, and My statutes (חֻקֹּתַי, chukotai) shall you keep," the Sifra distinguished "ordinances" (מִשְׁפָּטִים, mishpatim) from "statutes" (חֻקִּים, chukim). The term "ordinances" (מִשְׁפָּטִים, mishpatim), taught the Sifra, refers to rules that even had they not been written in the Torah, it would have been entirely logical to write them, like laws pertaining to theft, sexual immorality, idolatry, blasphemy and murder. The term "statutes" (חֻקִּים, chukim), taught the Sifra, refers to those rules that the impulse to do evil (יצר הרע, yetzer hara) and the nations of the world try to undermine, like eating pork (prohibited by Leviticus 11:7 and Deuteronomy 14:7–8), wearing wool-linen mixtures (שַׁעַטְנֵז, shatnez, prohibited by Leviticus 19:19 and Deuteronomy 22:11), release from levirate marriage (חליצה, chalitzah, mandated by Deuteronomy 25:5–10), purification of a person affected by skin disease (מְּצֹרָע, metzora, regulated in Leviticus 13–14), and the goat sent off into the wilderness (the "scapegoat," regulated in Leviticus 16). In regard to these, taught the Sifra, the Torah says simply that God legislated them and we have no right to raise doubts about them.

It was taught in a baraita that four types of people are accounted as though they were dead: a poor person, a person affected by skin disease (מְּצֹרָע, metzora), a blind person, and one who is childless. A poor person is accounted as dead, for Exodus 4:19 says, "for all the men are dead who sought your life" (and the Gemara interpreted this to mean that they had been stricken with poverty). A person affected by skin disease (מְּצֹרָע, metzora) is accounted as dead, for Numbers 12:10–12 says, "And Aaron looked upon Miriam, and behold, she was leprous (מְצֹרָעַת, metzora'at). And Aaron said to Moses ... let her not be as one dead." The blind are accounted as dead, for Lamentations 3:6 says, "He has set me in dark places, as they that be dead of old." And one who is childless is accounted as dead, for in Genesis 30:1, Rachel said, "Give me children, or else I am dead."

In the priest's examination of skin disease mandated by Leviticus 13:2, 9, and 14:2, the Mishnah taught that a priest could examine anyone else's symptoms, but not his own. And Rabbi Meir taught that the priest could not examine his relatives. The Mishnah taught that anyone could inspect skin disease, but only a priest could declare it unclean or clean. The Mishnah taught that the priests delayed examining a bridegroom—as well as his house and his garment—until after his seven days of rejoicing, and delayed examining anyone until after a holy day.

The Gemara taught that the early scholars were called soferim (related to the original sense of its root safar, "to count") because they used to count all the letters of the Torah (to ensure the correctness of the text). They used to say the vav (ו) in gachon, גָּחוֹן ("belly"), in Leviticus 11:42 marks the half-way point of the letters in the Torah. They used to say the words darosh darash, דָּרֹשׁ דָּרַשׁ ("diligently inquired"), in Leviticus 10:16 mark the half-way point of the words in the Torah. And they used to say Leviticus 13:33 marks the half-way point of the verses in the Torah. Rav Joseph asked whether the vav (ו) in gachon, גָּחוֹן ("belly"), in Leviticus 11:42 belonged to the first half or the second half of the Torah. (Rav Joseph presumed that the Torah contains an even number of letters.) The scholars replied that they could bring a Torah Scroll and count, for Rabbah bar bar Hanah said on a similar occasion that they did not stir from where they were until a Torah Scroll was brought and they counted. Rav Joseph replied that they (in Rabbah bar bar Hanah's time) were thoroughly versed in the proper defective and full spellings of words (that could be spelled in variant ways), but they (in Rav Joseph's time) were not. Similarly, Rav Joseph asked whether Leviticus 13:33 belongs to the first half or the second half of verses. Abaye replied that for verses, at least, we can bring a Scroll and count them. But Rav Joseph replied that even with verses, they could no longer be certain. For when Rav Aha bar Adda came (from the Land of Israel to Babylon), he said that in the West (in the Land of Israel), they divided Exodus 19:9 into three verses. Nonetheless, the Rabbis taught in a baraita that there are 5,888 verses in the Torah. (Note that others say the middle letter in our current Torah text is the aleph (א) in hu, הוּא ("he"), in Leviticus 8:28; the middle two words are el yesod, אֶל-יְסוֹד ("at the base of"), in Leviticus 8:15; the half-way point of the verses in the Torah is Leviticus 8:7; and there are 5,846 verses in the Torah text we have today.)

Rava recounted a baraita that taught that the rule of Leviticus 13:45 regarding one with skin disease, "the hair of his head shall be loose," also applied to a High Priest. The status of a High Priest throughout the year corresponded with that of any other person on a festival (with regard to mourning). For the Mishnah said that the High Priest could bring sacrifices on the altar even before he had buried his dead, but he could not eat sacrificial meat. From this restriction of a High Priest, the Gemara inferred that the High Priest would deport himself as a person with skin disease during a festival. And the Gemara continued to teach that a mourner is forbidden to cut his hair, because since Leviticus 10:6 ordained for the sons of Aaron: "Let not the hair of your heads go loose" (after the death of their brothers Nadab and Abihu), we infer that cutting hair is forbidden for everybody else (during mourning), as well.

Rabbi Abbahu, as well as Rabbi Uzziel the grandson of Rabbi Uzziel the Great, taught that Leviticus 13:46 requires that the person afflicted with skin disease "cry, 'Unclean! Unclean!'" to warn passers-by to keep away. But the Gemara cited a baraita that taught that Leviticus 13:46 requires that the person "cry, 'Unclean! Unclean!'" so that the person's distress would become known to many people, so that many could pray for mercy on the afflicted person's behalf. And the Gemara concluded that Leviticus 13:46 reads "Unclean" twice to teach that Leviticus 13:46 is intended to further both purposes, to keep passers-by away and to invite their prayers for mercy.

A midrash taught that Divine Justice first attacks a person's substance and then the person's body. So when leprous plagues come upon a person, first they come upon the fabric of the person's house. If the person repents, then Leviticus 14:40 requires that only the affected stones need to be pulled out; if the person does not repent, then Leviticus 14:45 requires pulling down the house. Then the plagues come upon the person's clothes. If the person repents, then the clothes require washing; if not, they require burning. Then the plagues come upon the person's body. If the person repents, Leviticus 14:1–32 provides for purification; if not, then Leviticus 13:46 ordains that the person "shall dwell alone."

Similarly, the Tosefta reported that when a person would come to the priest, the priest would tell the person to engage in self-examination and turn from evil ways. The priest would continue that plagues come only from gossip, and skin disease from arrogance. But God would judge in mercy. The plague would come to the house, and if the homeowner repented, the house required only dismantling, but if the homeowner did not repent, the house required demolition. They would appear on clothing, and if the owner repented, the clothing required only tearing, but if the owner did not repent, the clothing required burning. They would appear on the person's body, and if the person repented, well and good, but if the person did not repent, Leviticus 13:46 required that the person "shall dwell alone."

Rabbi Samuel bar Elnadab asked Rabbi Haninah (or others say Rabbi Samuel bar Nadab the son-in-law of Rabbi Haninah asked Rabbi Haninah, or still others say, asked Rabbi Joshua ben Levi) what distinguished the person afflicted with skin disease that Leviticus 13:46 ordains that the person "shall dwell alone." The answer was that through gossip, the person afflicted with skin disease separated husband from wife, one neighbor from another, and therefore the Torah punished the person afflicted with skin disease measure for measure, ordaining that the person "shall dwell alone."

In a baraita, Rabbi Jose related that a certain Elder from Jerusalem told him that 24 types of patients are afflicted with boils. The Gemara then related that Rabbi Joḥanan warned to be careful of the flies found on those afflicted with the disease ra’atan, as flies carried the disease. Rabbi Zeira would not sit in a spot where the wind blew from the direction of someone afflicted with ra’atan. Rabbi Elazar would not enter the tent of one afflicted with ra’atan, and Rabbi Ami and Rabbi Asi would not eat eggs from an alley in which someone afflicted with ra’atan lived. Rabbi Joshua ben Levi, however, would attach himself to those afflicted with ra’atan and study Torah, saying this was justified by Proverbs 5:19, "The Torah is a loving hind and a graceful doe." Rabbi Joshua reasoned that if Torah bestows grace on those who learn it, it could protect them from illness. When Rabbi Joshua ben Levi was on the verge of dying, the Gemara told, the Angel of Death was instructed to perform Rabbi Joshua's bidding, as he was a righteous man and deserves to die in the way that he saw fit. Rabbi Joshua ben Levi asked the Angel of Death to show him his place in paradise, and the Angel agreed. Rabbi Joshua ben Levi asked the Angel to give him the knife that the Angel used to kill people, lest the Angel frighten him on the way, and the Angel gave it to him. When they arrived in paradise, the Angel lifted Rabbi Joshua so that he could see his place in paradise, and Rabbi Joshua jumped to the other side, escaping into paradise. Elijah the Prophet then told those in paradise to make way for Rabbi Joshua.

The Gemara told that Rabbi Joshua ben Levi asked Elijah when the Messiah would come, and Elijah told Rabbi Joshua ben Levi that he could find the Messiah sitting at the entrance of the city of Rome among the poor who suffer from illnesses.

== In medieval Jewish interpretation ==
The parashah is discussed in these medieval Jewish sources:

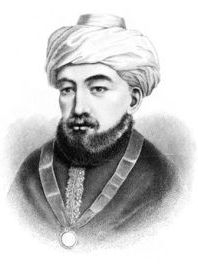
Maimonides

=== Leviticus chapter 12 ===
Reading Leviticus 12:3, Maimonides taught that baby boys are circumcised on the eighth day because all animals are very delicate just after birth, almost as though they were still fetuses in the womb, until seven days have passed. Only then does the Torah deem them ready to be exposed to the outside world. Maimonides argued that this is true of all animals, citing the law regarding male firstborn sacrificial animals in Exodus 22:29, "Seven days shall it be with its mother."

Maimonides taught that the laws of impurity serve many uses: (1) They keep Jews at a distance from dirty and filthy objects. (2) They guard the Sanctuary. (3) They pay regard to an established custom. (4) They lightened the burden. For these laws do not impede people affected with impurity in their ordinary occupations. For the distinction between pure and impure applies only with reference to the Sanctuary and the holy objects connected with it; it does not apply to other cases. Citing Leviticus 12:4, "She shall touch no hallowed thing, nor come into the Sanctuary," Maimonides noted that people who do not intend to enter the Sanctuary or touch any holy thing are not guilty of any sin if they remain unclean as long as they like, and eat, according to their pleasure, ordinary food that has been in contact with unclean things.

Maimonides read Leviticus 4:16 and 12:8, "The priest shall make expiation," to define a duty exclusive to priests. Maimonides taught that Levites, in contrast, did not "make expiation"—they sang, to move the spirit.

=== Leviticus chapter 13 ===
Reading Leviticus 13:46, Maimonides noted that skin disease kept one out of the Sanctuary—as did contact with a corpse (Leviticus 11:27), touching one of the eight kinds of vermin (Leviticus 11:29–30), touching one with skin disease (Leviticus 13:46), touching one oozing flux (Leviticus 15:2), touching the bedding of one with skin disease (Leviticus 15:5), touching a menstruant woman (Leviticus 15:18), having a nocturnal emission, or having sexual relations. All these events kept people out of the Sanctuary, preventing merely casual visits. Maimonides reasoned that there are so many causes of impurity that few people would have been ritually pure. Maimonides argued that God barred impure people from the Sanctuary with the intention that visiting it would be rare, so that constant contact with the Sanctuary would not diminish its emotional impact. This would thus further the object of the Sanctuary to inspire reverence and awe in those who did come to it; as God enjoins in Leviticus 19:30, "Revere My Sanctuary."

== In modern interpretation ==
The parashah is discussed in these modern sources:

=== Leviticus chapters 12–15 ===
Jay Sklar identified the following chiastic structure in Leviticus 12–15:

A—impurity resulting from loss of bodily fluids (blood lost in childbirth) (Leviticus 12)

B—impurity resulting from ritually defiling disease (Leviticus 13–14)

A'—impurity resulting from loss of bodily fluids (genital discharges) (Leviticus 15)

=== Leviticus chapter 12 ===
Elaine Goodfriend observed that Leviticus 12 and its focus on menstruating women had an enormous effect on Jewish women's lives. Goodfriend reported that "the view that women—via their normal, recurring bodily functions—generate a pollution antagonistic to holiness served as a justification for women's distance from the sacred throughout Jewish history." Goodfriend speculated that the priesthood excluded women because of "fear that the sudden onset of menstruation would result in the clash of impurity and holiness, with presumed dire consequences." Goodfriend noted that these laws and associated customs affected both women's public religious life and private family life, as they and their husbands were prohibited from sex for extensive periods of time, affecting their fertility and married life in general.

Shaye Cohen noted that the only element in common between the "ritual" or physical impurities of Leviticus 11–15 and the "dangerous" or sinful impurities of Leviticus 18 is intercourse with a menstruant.

=== Leviticus chapter 13 ===
Ephraim Speiser wrote that the word "Torah" (תּוֹרָה) is based on a verbal stem signifying "to teach" or "to guide". The like and the derived noun can carry a variety of meanings, including in Leviticus 13:59, 14:2, 54, and 57, specific rituals for what is sometimes called leprosy. Speiser argued that in context, the word cannot be mistaken for the title of the Pentateuch as a whole.

== Commandments ==
=== According to Maimonides ===
Maimonides cited verses in this parashah for 3 positive and 1 negative commandments:

- To circumcise the son, as it is written "and on the eighth day the flesh of his foreskin shall be circumcised"
- For a woman after childbirth to bring a sacrifice after she becomes clean, as it is written "and when the days of her purification are fulfilled"
- Not to shave off the hair of the scall, as it is written "but the scall shall he not shave"
- For the person with skin disease to be known to all by the things written about the person, "his clothes shall be rent, and the hair of his head shall go loose, and he shall cover his upper lip, and shall cry: 'unclean, unclean.'" So too, all other unclean persons must declare themselves.

=== According to Sefer ha-Chinuch ===
According to Sefer ha-Chinuch, there are 5 positive and 2 negative commandments in the parashah:

- The precept about the ritual uncleanness of a woman after childbirth
- A ritually unclean person is not to eat meat of holy sacrifices.
- The precept of a woman's offering after giving birth
- The precept regarding the ritual uncleanness of a m'tzora (person with skin disease (צָּרַעַת, tzara'at)
- The prohibition against shaving the area of a nethek (an impurity in hair)
- That one with skin disease (צָּרַעַת, tzara'at), among others, should rend clothes.
- The precept of צָּרַעַת, tzara'at in cloth

== In the liturgy ==
Some Jews refer to the laws of bird offerings in Leviticus 12:8 and the laws of the menstrual cycle as they study the end of chapter 3 of Pirkei Avot on a Sabbath between Passover and Rosh Hashanah.

Some Jews refer to the guilt offerings for skin disease in Leviticus 13 as part of readings on the offerings after the Sabbath morning blessings.

Following the Shacharit morning prayer service, some Jews recite the Six Remembrances, among which is Deuteronomy 24:9, "Remember what the Lord your God did to Miriam by the way as you came forth out of Egypt," recalling that God punished Miriam with צָּרַעַת, tzara'at.

== The Weekly Maqam ==
In the Weekly Maqam, Sephardi Jews each week base the songs of the services on the content of that week's parashah. For Parashat Tazria, Sephardi Jews apply Maqam Saba, the maqam that symbolizes a covenant (brit). This is appropriate, because this parashah commences with the discussion of what to do when a baby boy is born. It also mentions the brit milah, a ritual that shows a covenant between man and God.

== Haftarah ==
The haftarah for the parashah (when read individually on a Sabbath that is not a special Sabbath) is 2 Kings 4:42–5:19.

=== Summary ===
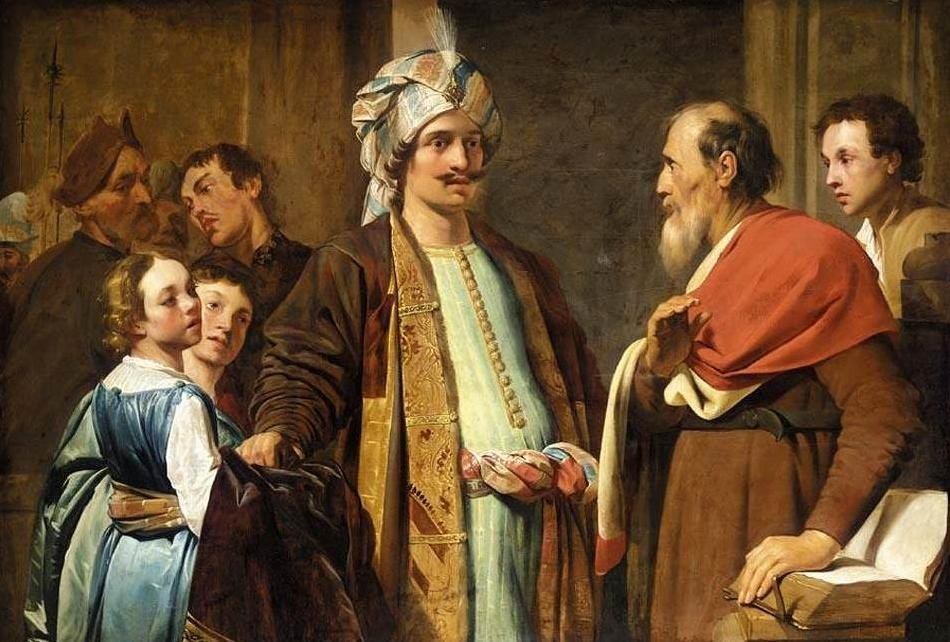
Elisha Refusing Gifts from Naaman (1630 painting by Pieter de Grebber)

A man from Baal-shalishah brought the prophet Elisha bread of the First Fruits—20 loaves of barley—and fresh grain in his sack to give to the people to eat. Elisha's servant asked Elisha how he could feed a hundred men with these rations, but Elisha told his servant to give the food to the people, for God said that they would eat and have food left over. So the servant set the food before the men, they ate, and they had food left over, just as God had said.

Naaman, the commander of the army of the king of Aram, was a great warrior, but he was a leper. The girl who waited on Naaman's wife was an Israelite whom the Arameans had taken captive, and she told Naaman's wife that if Naaman went to Elisha in Samaria, then Elisha would cure Naaman of his leprosy. Naaman told his lord the king of Aram what the girl said, and the king of Aram sent Naaman on his way with a letter to the king of Israel. Naaman departed, taking with him ten talents of silver, 6,000 pieces of gold, and ten changes of clothes. Naaman brought the king of Israel the letter, which asked the king of Israel to cure Naaman of his leprosy. When the king of Israel read the letter, he rent his clothes and complained that he was not God with power over life and death, but the king of Aram must have been seeking some pretext to attack Israel.

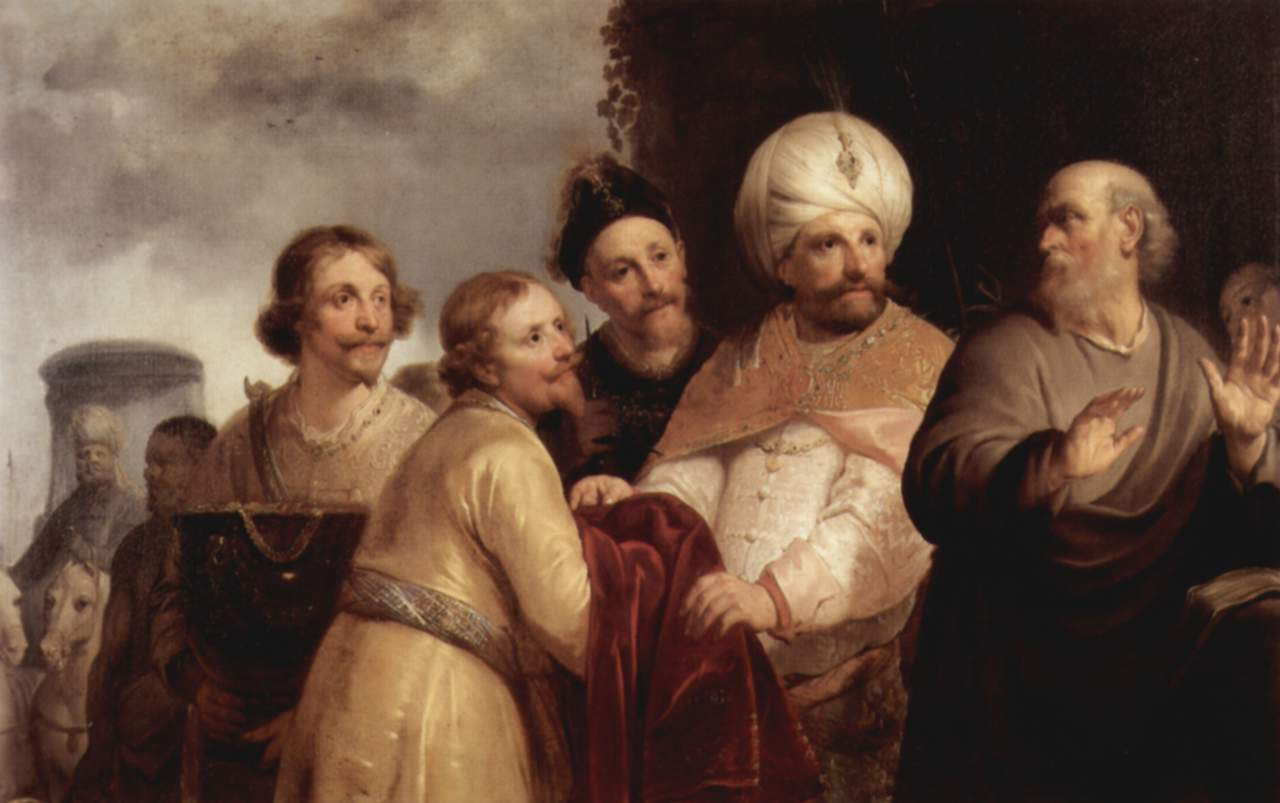
Elisha refusing the gifts of Naaman (1637 painting by Pieter de Grebber)

When Elisha heard, he invited the king to send Naaman to him, and so Naaman came to Elisha's house with his horses and his chariots. Elisha sent a messenger to Naaman to tell him to wash seven times in the Jordan River and be healed, but that angered Naaman, who expected Elisha to come out, call on the name of God, and wave his hands over Naaman. Naaman asked whether the Amanah and Pharpar rivers of Damascus were not better than any river in Israel, so that he might wash in them and be clean.

But Naaman's servants advised him that if Elisha had directed him to do some difficult thing he would have done it, so how much more should he do what Elisha directed when he said merely to wash and be clean. So Naaman dipped himself seven times in the Jordan, and his flesh came back like the flesh of a little child.

Naaman returned to Elisha, avowed that there is no God except in Israel, and asked Elisha to take a present, but Elisha declined. Naaman asked if he might take two mule loads of Israel's earth so that Naaman might make offerings to God, and he asked that God might pardon Naaman when had had to bow before the Aramean idol Rimmon when the king of Aram leaned on Naaman to bow before Rimmon. And Elisha told Naaman to go in peace.

=== Connection to the parashah ===
Both the parashah and the haftarah report the treatment of skin disease, the parashah by the priests, and the haftarah by the prophet Elisha. Both the parashah and the haftarah frequently employ the term for skin disease (צָּרַעַת, tzara'at).

A midrash deduced from the characterization of Naaman as a "great man" in 2 Kings 5:1 that Naaman was haughty on account of his being a great warrior, and as a result was smitten with leprosy.

And fundamentally, both the parashah and the haftarah view skin disease as related to the Divine sphere and an occasion for interaction with God.

=== The haftarah in classical rabbinic interpretation ===
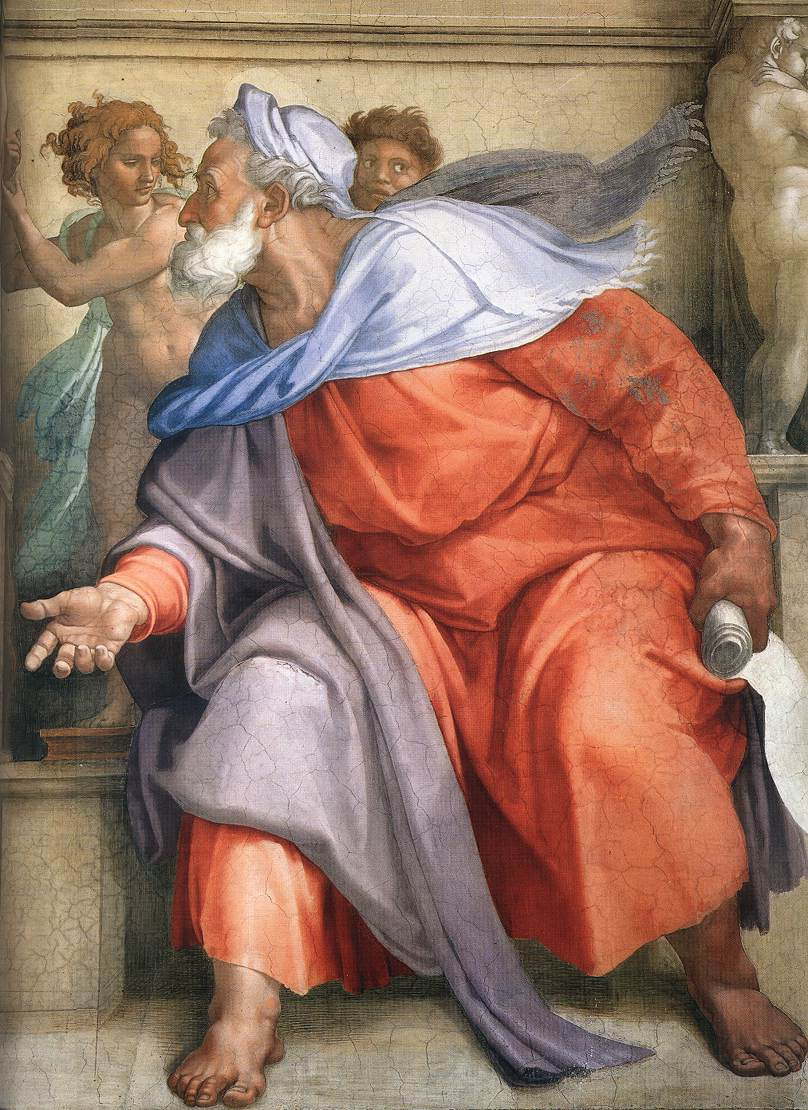
Ezekiel (1510 fresco by Michelangelo from the Sistine Chapel)

The Mekhilta of Rabbi Ishmael considered Naaman a more righteous convert than Jethro. Reading Jethro's words in Exodus 18:11, "Now I know that the Lord is greater than all gods," the Mekhilta of Rabbi Ishmael reported that they said that there was not an idol in the world that Jethro failed to seek out and worship, for Jethro said "than all gods." The Mekhilta of Rabbi Ishmael taught that Naaman, however, knew better than Jethro that there was no other god, for Naaman said in 2 Kings 5:15, "Behold now, I know that there is no God in all the earth, but in Israel." The Babylonian Talmud, however, taught that Naaman was merely a resident alien who observed the seven Noahide commandments (including the prohibition on idolatry).

=== On Shabbat HaChodesh ===
When the parashah coincides with Shabbat HaChodesh ("Sabbath [of] the month," the special Sabbath preceding the Hebrew month of Nissan—as it does in 2022), the haftarah is:

- for Ashkenazi Jews: Ezekiel 45:16–46:18
- for Sephardi Jews: Ezekiel 45:18–46:15

=== Connection to the Special Sabbath ===
On Shabbat HaChodesh, Jews read Exodus 12:1–20, in which God commands that "This month [Nissan] shall be the beginning of months; it shall be the first month of the year," and in which God issued the commandments of Passover. Similarly, the haftarah in Ezekiel 45:21–25 discusses Passover. In both the special reading and the haftarah, God instructs the Israelites to apply blood to doorposts.

=== Parashat Tazria–Metzora ===
In non-leap years, Parashat Tazria is always combined with Parashat Metzora (as it is in 2025, 2026, and 2028). If it is not a special Sabbath, the haftarah is then the haftarah for Parashat Metzora, 2 Kings 7:3–20.

==== Summary ====
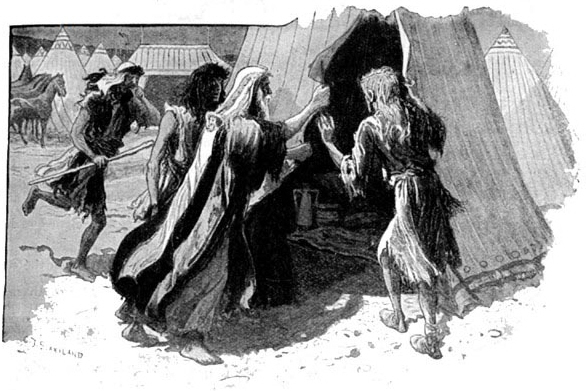
The lepers went into a tent (illustration by Charles Joseph Staniland (1838–1916))

During the Arameans' siege of Samaria, four leprous men at the gate asked each other why they should die there of starvation, when they might go to the Arameans, who would either save them or leave them no worse than they were. When at twilight, they went to the Arameans' camp, there was no one there, for God had made the Arameans hear chariots, horses, and a great army, and fearing the Hittites and the Egyptians, they fled, leaving their tents, their horses, their donkeys, and their camp. The lepers went into a tent, ate and drank, and carried away silver, gold, and clothing from the tents and hid it.

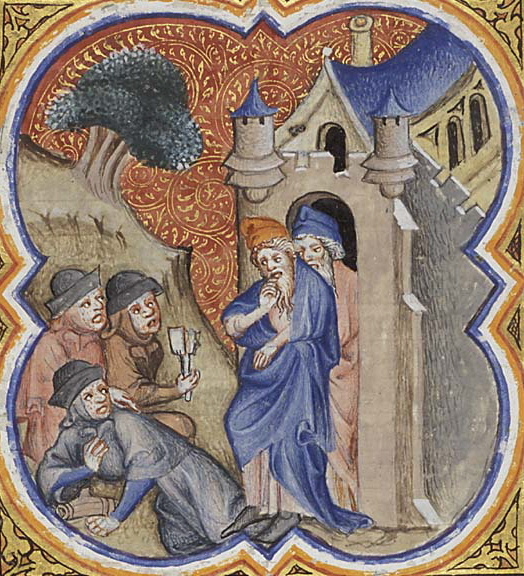
The four lepers bring the news to the guards at the gate of Samaria (illumination from Petrus Comestor's 1372 Bible Historiale)

Feeling qualms of guilt, they went to go tell the king of Samaria, and called to the porters of the city telling them what they had seen, and the porters told the king's household within. The king arose in the night, and told his servants that he suspected that the Arameans had hidden in the field, thinking that when the Samaritans came out, they would be able to get into the city. One of his servants suggested that some men take five of the horses that remained and go see, and they took two chariots with horses to go and see. They went after the Arameans as far as the Jordan River, and all the way was littered with garments and vessels that the Arameans had cast away in their haste, and the messengers returned and told the king. So the people went out and looted the Arameans' camp, so that the price of fine flour and two measures of barley each dropped to a shekel, as God had said it would. And the king appointed the captain on whom he leaned to take charge of the gate, and the people trampled him and killed him before he could taste of the flour, just as the man of God Elisha had said.

==== Connection to the double parashah ====
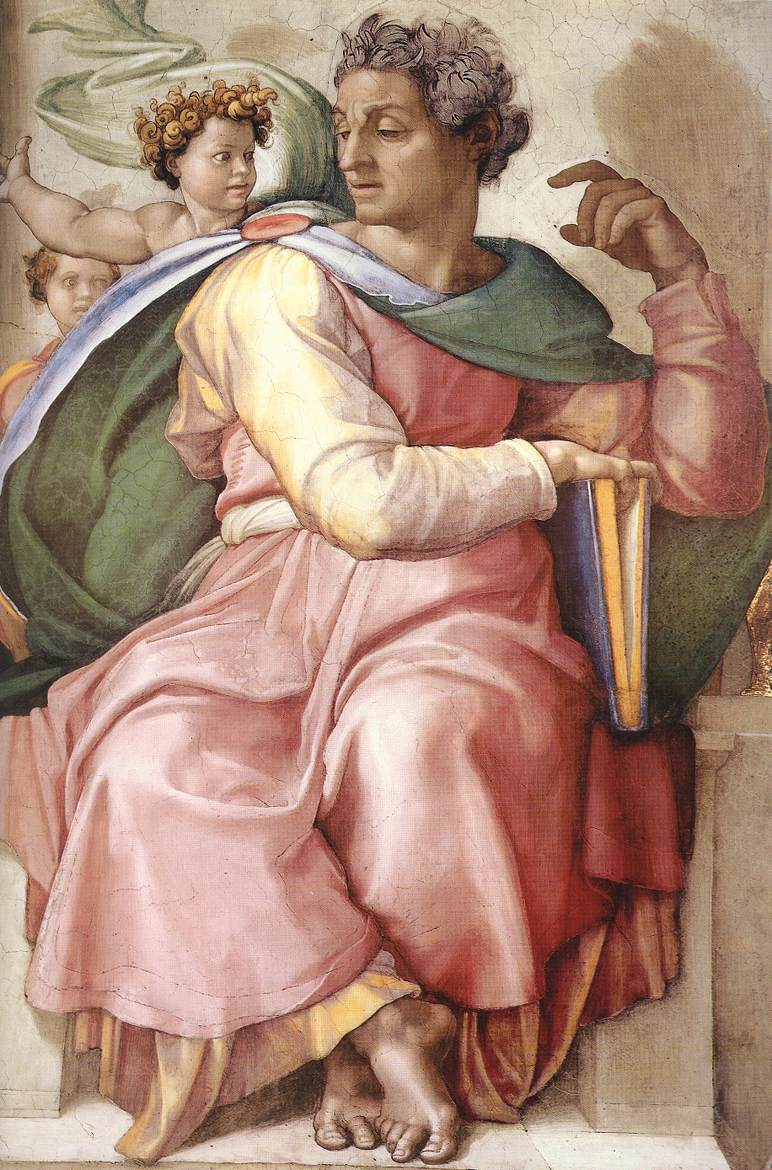
Isaiah (fresco circa 1508–1512 by Michelangelo from the Sistine Chapel)

Both the double parashah and the haftarah deal with people stricken with skin disease. Both the parashah and the haftarah employ the term for the person affected by skin disease (metzora, מְּצֹרָע). In Parashat Tazria, Leviticus 13:46 provides that the person with skin disease "shall dwell alone; without the camp shall his dwelling be," thus explaining why the four leprous men in the haftarah lived outside the gate.

Rabbi Joḥanan taught that the four leprous men at the gate in 2 Kings 7:3 were none other than Elisha's former servant Gehazi (whom the midrash, above, cited as having been stricken with leprosy for profanation of the Divine Name) and his three sons.

In Parashat Metzora, when there "seems" to be a plague in the house, the priest must not jump to conclusions, but must examine the facts. Just before the opening of the haftarah, in 2 Kings 7:2, the captain on whom the king leaned jumps to the conclusion that Elisha's prophecy could not come true, and the captain meets his punishment in 2 Kings 7:17 and 19.

=== On Shabbat Rosh Chodesh ===
When the combined parashah coincides with Shabbat Rosh Chodesh (as it does in 2026), the haftarah is Isaiah 66:1–24.
