= Gregory Minh =

Russian epidemiologist and pathologist (1836–1896)

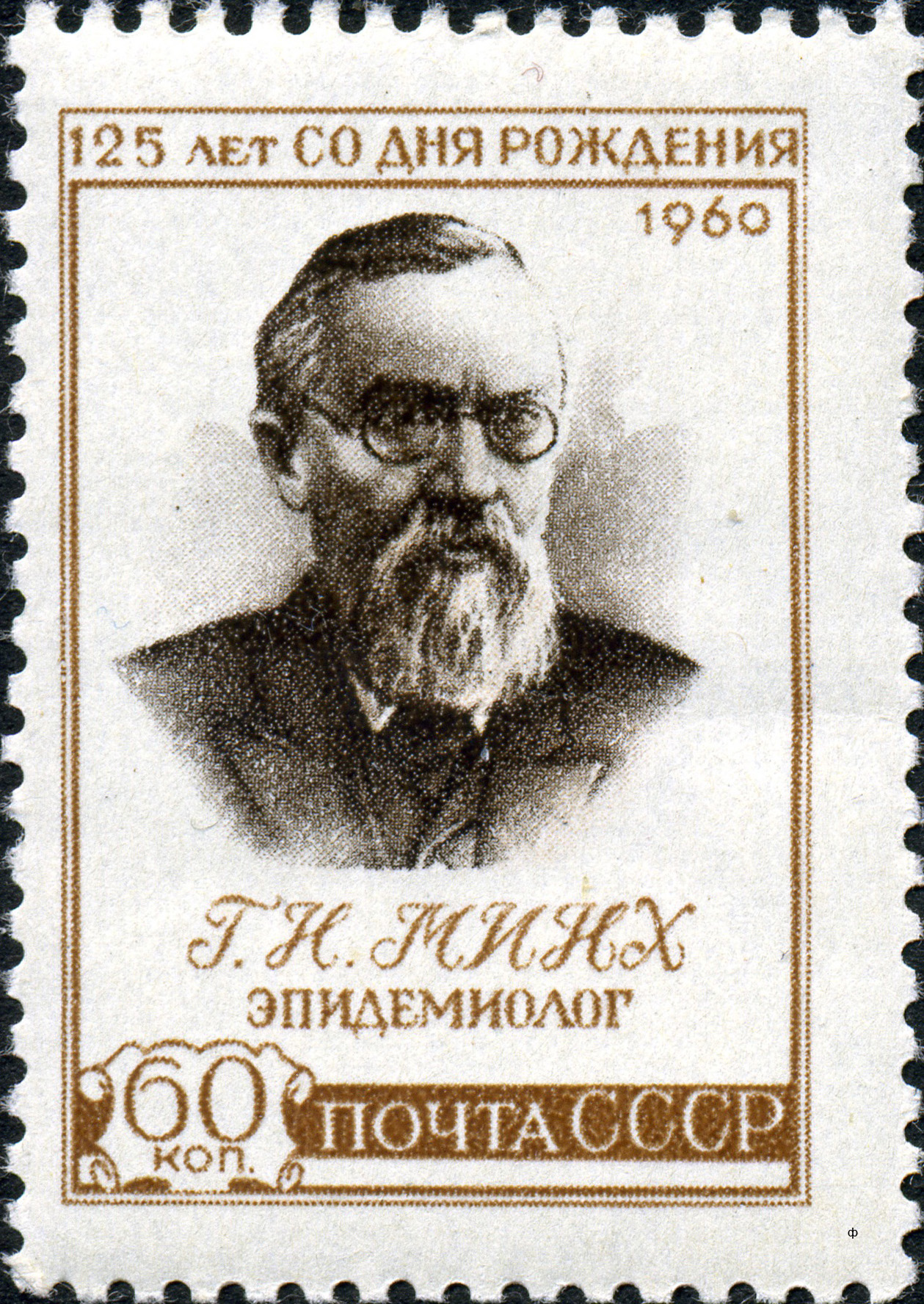
Gregory Minh

Gregory Minh (Russian: Григорий Николаевич Минх; September 7, 1836 – December 12, 1896 in Saratov), was a Russian epidemiologist, and pathologist. He was a professor at the Department of Pathological Anatomy at the University of St. Vladimir in Kiev.

== Biography ==
An early 20th-century Russian postcard picturing Saint Vladimir University in Kiev.

Educated at the grammar school in Saratov and Moscow University, Minh then spent several years as an intern at the therapeutic clinic of Professor Zakharyin. As a young doctor studying typhoid's effects, he injected himself with typhoid blood, thus contracting the disease and nearly died from its complications. Between 1863 and 1865, he traveled to Germany to study pathological anatomy. In 1876, he took the chair as director of pathological anatomy at the University of Kiev, where he was subsequently (four years later) promoted to full professor.

== Study of leprosy, vitiligo and tzaraath ==
Minh spent a decade studying leprosy and vitiligo in various parts of Russia. Having explored the foci of leprosy during a special expedition to Persia, Central Asia and the Caucasus, he gave a description of the clinic and epidemiology of leprosy, and proved that leprosy is an infectious disease. He likewise visited the Astrakhan steppes, the Kuban region, and as for as a trip to Egypt and the Levant, where he collected extensive material on the history of leprosy since ancient times. Minh maintained that the biblical tzaraath is synonymous with the modern term vitiligo.

== Study of anthrax ==
Studying the epidemiology of typhus and relapsing fever, he found that the carriers of these diseases where blood-sucking insects. His work, "Plague in Russia" (1898), written on the basis of the study of the epidemic in 1878-79 in the village of Vetlyanskaya (Vetluzhsky), was the work of his personal involvement therein; in this work, the characteristic of the clinic and the bubonic plague and pneumonic forms indicated the route of infection. He also found that both intestinal and pulmonary anthrax have a common origin. In 1873, he described the anthrax as bodies that migrate in cells, but was not able to properly assess the significance of this observation.

== Vetlyanskoy plague of 1879 ==
Minh acquired widespread recognition due to his report on the vetlyanskoy plague of 1879.

== Literary works ==
1. Leprosy (Lepra arabicum) in the south of Russia vol. 1, no. 1-4, Kiev. 1884-87
2. Проказа и песь (Leprosy and Vitiligo) [Kiev], 1890.
3. The doctrine of the development of false membranes on the serous surfaces - Thesis, Moscow, 1870
