= Yehuda L. Katzenelson =

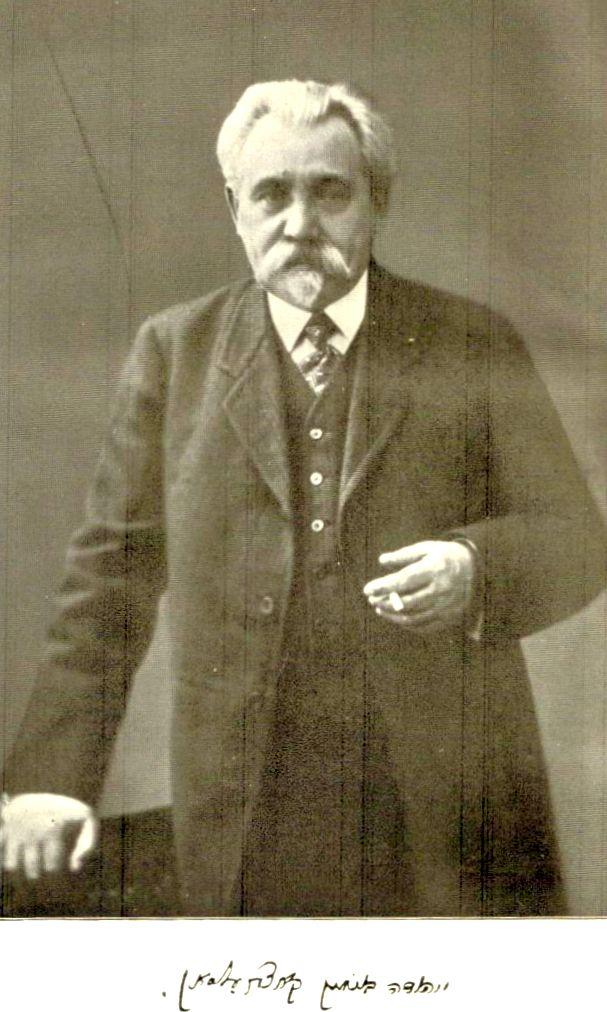
Yehuda L. Katzenelson

Yehuda Leib Katsnelson, (Russian: Лев (Иегуда Лейб Вениамин) Израилевич Каценельсон; 29 November 1846, (Hebrew Calendar 10 Kislev 5690), Chernigov – 1917, Petrograd), also known by his pen name 'Buki Ben Yogli', was a military doctor, writer and publicist of Hebrew Literature.

== Early life ==
Katznelson was born in November 1846 in Chernigov in the South-West Russian Empire (now in Ukraine). He studied at the Zhytomyr Rabbinical School and Teachers' Seminary, and began his medical study at the University of Saint Petersburg. During his studies he worked as a teacher of Hebrew for beginners at the Jewish school run by Eliezer Berman.

In 1865, Katzenelson attended the government-sponsored rabbinical seminary in Zhitomir.

== Career ==
After graduating, he served as a military physician in the Ottoman–Russian War (1877–78). At the end of the war, Katznelson settled in Saint Petersburg.

As a young man, he worked for Hebrew-language newspapers (e.g.Today, a Russian newspaper) as an editor and contributed to articles on scientific matters.

He began to write about medical science, drawing on the Talmud as relevant to modern medicine. These articles were assembled later in his book The Wisdom of the Talmud and Medicine. Katznelson did not identify as a Zionist at the beginning of his public career, but supported Jewish Territorialists. He was eager to promote Jewish-owned agricultural advances wherever possible, especially in southern Russia and the Jewish colonies in Argentina.

In 1909, he visited the Land of Israel and toured Jewish settlements. This visit changed his opinion; he abandoned territorialism and began to support practical Zionism.

After the resignation of Simon Dubnov, Katznelson was appointed to the main Iibrskyh encyclopedia. Katznelson taught Russian and lectured in Oriental Studies, focusing on the settlement of the Land of Israel. Many of Katznelson's books were published outside of Russia.

Katznelson Leib practiced medicine in St. Petersburg until his death in 1917.

He was the author of a work on talmudic medicine; among other topics it analyzed the parallels between vitiligo and biblical Tzaraath.

Katznelson developed fame with the Jewish people. Monographs on his life and works include those by David Frishman, Jacob Fichman, Ben-Zion Katz, Menachem Ribolob and Reuben Brainin, Messed Lachover and Israel Cohen.

Tel Aviv named a street after him, using his literary pseudonym "Buki Ben Yogli".

== Literary work ==
- Nightingale / by Buki Ben Yogli, Warsaw: Achiassaf, 1894. (series' stories Buki Ben Yogli (for. Katznelson); booklet a) (Note: See Review: Abraham Singer, "nightingale" story from Buki Ben Yogli (Dr. L.. Katzanalsaָn) 24 April 1895)
- Tales and Stories (with an introduction by Reuben Brainin), New York:1918.
- Il Katzanalsan complete works, in three parts (published by Joseph Luria), St. Petersburg: Trs"h −1905.
- What I was seeing and my ears heard Memoirs of my life, Jerusalem: Bialik Institute, 1947. Read an excerpt here. (Note: See Review: "thing" by Jacob Fichman, Buki Ben Yogli (leave "what they saw eyes "by" Bialik ") 8 August 1947 unknown ref 00304.)
- Mists of antiquity: historical painting, Odessa: Achiassaf, Tra"b −1912.
- Bone of organs: some episodes in the Thought of Creation, St. Petersburg: Trm"h −1887.
- Nightingale: a selection of stories (together with its history written by Jacob Fichman), Tel Aviv: Am Oved, Ts"d −1944.
- Medical Wisdom of the Talmud, Berlin: The Life, −1928.
- The lord of the field – a Children's Story
