= Leukotrichia =

Horse fur marking

Reticulated Leukotrichia seen on the back of a horse.

Leukotrichia (also called lacing or snowflakes) is a rare type of marking found on the backs of horses indicated by streaks of lost pigment in the fur that grows out overtime. The exact cause of leukotrichia is currently unclear, but it is speculated that it may be genetically inherited, caused by a reaction to vaccines/drugs, or due to extreme prolonged exposure to the sun.

There are four types, they include (i) reticulated leukotrichia, (ii) hyperesthetic leukotrichia, and (iii) spotted leukotrichia. Reticulated leukotrichia is harmless and may sometimes be mistaken for rabicano. Hyperesthetic leukotrichia (HL) consists of painful lesions that necessitate treatment as it forms. It rarely affects horses mostly affecting Arabian horses and American paint horses. HL mainly occur in summer and may rescue. HL may be a variant of erythema multiforme (EM) however no studies have been done to investigating this condition. Spotted leukotrichia is harmless and may be confused for a snowflake pattern. The skin underneath typically retains its pigment.

== See also ==
- Horse markings
