= Mosaic of Rehob =

Hebrew-language mosaic

- Inscription of Tel Rehov
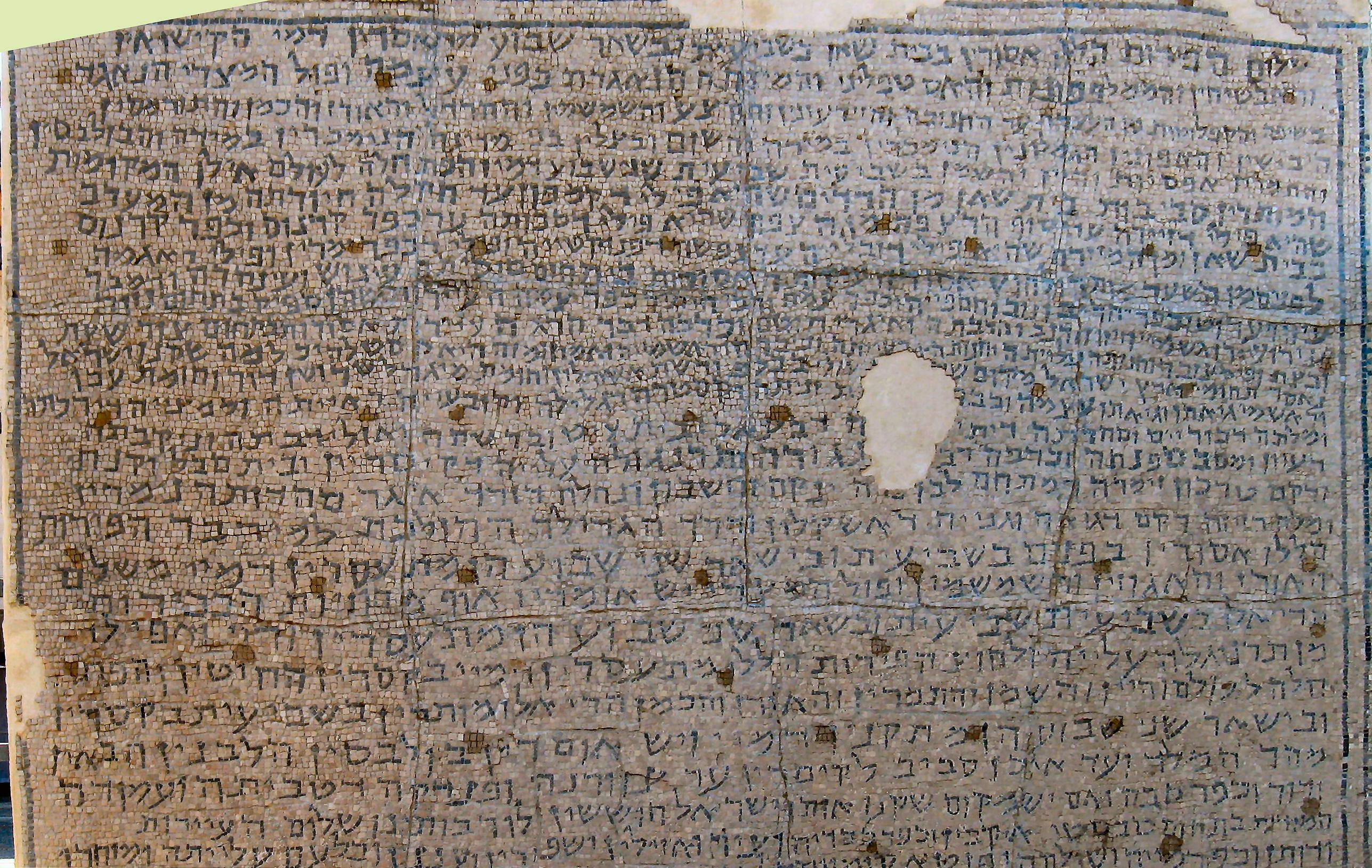
- Mosaic of Rehob

- Location within Israel
- 32°27′47″N 35°29′37″E
- Type: Mosaic
- Periods: Roman to Byzantine
- Cultures: Byzantine
- Location: Tell el-Farwana (Khirbet Farwana), Israel
- Region: Beit She'an, Israel
- Part of: Synagogue

History
- Built: c. late 3rd century CE
- Abandoned: 7th century CE

Site notes
- Area: 4.30 by 2.75 metres (14.1 ft × 9.0 ft)
- Excavation dates: 1973
- Archaeologists: Yaakov Sussmann, Shaul Lieberman, Fanny Vitto
- Condition: Good (although removed from locale)
- Owner: Israel Museum
- Public access: Yes, both to the museum and to the open field with scarce remains
- Website: imj.org.il/en/collections/395953-0

The Mosaic of Reḥob (Hebrew: כתובת רחוב, romanized: k'tovet rechov, also known as the Tel Rehov inscription and the Baraita of the Boundaries) is a late 3rd–6th century CE mosaic discovered in 1973. The mosaic, written in late Mishnaic Hebrew, describes the geography and agricultural rules of the local Jews of the era. It was inlaid in the floor of the foyer or narthex of an ancient synagogue near Tel Rehov, 4.5 kilometres (2.8 mi) south of Beit She'an and about 6.5 kilometres (4.0 mi) west of the Jordan River. The mosaic contains the longest written text yet discovered in any Hebrew mosaic in Israel, and also the oldest known Talmudic text.

Unlike other mosaics found in the region, the Reḥob mosaic is unique not for its artistry and ornate patterns but for the text incorporated in it. Scholars say it is one of the most important epigraphical findings in the Holy Land in the last century, and sheds invaluable light on the historical geography of Palestine during the Late Roman and Byzantine periods, as well as on Jewish and non-Jewish ethnographic divisions in Palestine for the same periods.

The mosaic describes the body of Jewish law regulating the use of farm products grown in different regions. In Jewish tradition, certain laws are only applicable within the Land of Israel proper. By delineating the boundaries of the Land of Israel at the time, the mosaic seeks to establish the legal status of the country in its various parts from the time of the Jewish people's return from the Babylonian captivity. (Note: The Rabbis distinguish between those laws that must be upheld in the land and which are dependent upon the boundaries of the country at the time of the return of Jews from the Babylonian captivity (Hebrew: עולי בבל), as opposed to a set of different laws which apply to the country that extends beyond the one just named, and which was settled in its entirety by the people who departed Egypt in the days of Moses (Hebrew: עולי מצרים). The laws pertaining to the Seventh Year apply only to that territory formerly occupied by Jews who returned from the Babylonian captivity in the days of Ezra. The Baraita, or external teachings herein discussed, treats on the borders of Eretz-Israel and is only used as a geographical reference to the old borders during the time of Israel's return from the Babylonian captivity. That is to say, the country as it was once settled. Today's demographic make-up of the country has changed, but the halakhic ramifications of the country, such as those laws dependent upon the land, are made contingent upon the borders of the country at the time of the Jewish return from the Babylonian captivity.) It describes whether or not local farm products acquired by Jews from various sources are exempt from the laws of Seventh Year produce, and gives guidelines for dealing with demai produce (produce whose tithing status is uncertain).

== History ==
The mosaic was located in an ancient synagogue in a Late Roman and Byzantine-period Jewish village about one kilometre (0.6 mile) northwest of Tel Rehov in what is now northeast Israel. The area preserved the old name in the form of Rehov (Hebrew) or Roob/Roōb (Latin).

According to the archaeologist Fanny Vitto, the village synagogue underwent three phases of construction and reconstruction. It was first built as a basilical hall in the 4th century CE. The hall was destroyed by a fire and rebuilt in the following century, with the addition of a bemah, a new mosaic floor and a plaster coating for the walls and pillars, decorated with several inscriptions. In the last phase, dating to the 6th or 7th century CE, the narthex was added, on whose floor the mosaic inscription was laid. Others put the creation of the halakhic inscription in the late 3rd century CE at the earliest. The synagogue was probably abandoned after being destroyed in an earthquake.

The remains of the ancient synagogue were discovered by members of Kibbutz Ein HaNetziv while preparing land for cultivation in the late 1960s. An archaeological excavation of the site in 1973, led by a team under IAA's Fanny Vitto, revealed the mosaic and its content, which has been on display at the Israel Museum in Jerusalem since 1978.

== Description of mosaic ==
The mosaic pieces are made of black limestone tesserae contrasted against a white background. The mosaic measures 4.30 by 2.75 metres (14.1 ft × 9.0 ft), with an accompanying text written on 29 lines, comprising a total of 364 words, with an average length of 4 metres (13 ft) to each line. It begins with the salutation Shalom ("Peace") followed by a long halakhic text, and ends with Shalom once more. It is followed by an appendix where it lists some eighteen towns in the vicinity of Sebaste (the ancient city of Samaria) whose fruits and vegetables were exempt from tithes and the stringencies applied to Seventh Year produce. There is little uniformity in the size of the letters, and the spelling of some words is faulty. Portions of the main text contain elements that are related to late second-century rabbinic literature, particularly that found in the Tosefta (Shevi'it 4:8–11), the Jerusalem Talmud (Demai 2:1; Shevi'it 6:1) and Sifrei on Deuteronomy 11:24, although the mosaic of Reḥob expands on aspects of each. Some scholars have raised the hypothesis that the content of the mosaic was copied from a letter sent by the Sages of Israel to the heads of the synagogue. At any rate, it is the largest known text found on any Hebrew mosaic in Israel to date, as well as the oldest known Talmudic text. The more ancient text in the Reḥob mosaic has been used to correct errors in transmission of extant rabbinic texts.

From a philological perspective, the system of spelling in the mosaic follows the Beth-Shean practice of enunciation, where ʻayin (ע) is often interchanged with aleph (א), and ḥet (ח) is often interchanged with he (ה), as is alluded to in the Jerusalem Talmud (Berakhot 2:4).

== Legal (halakhic) background ==
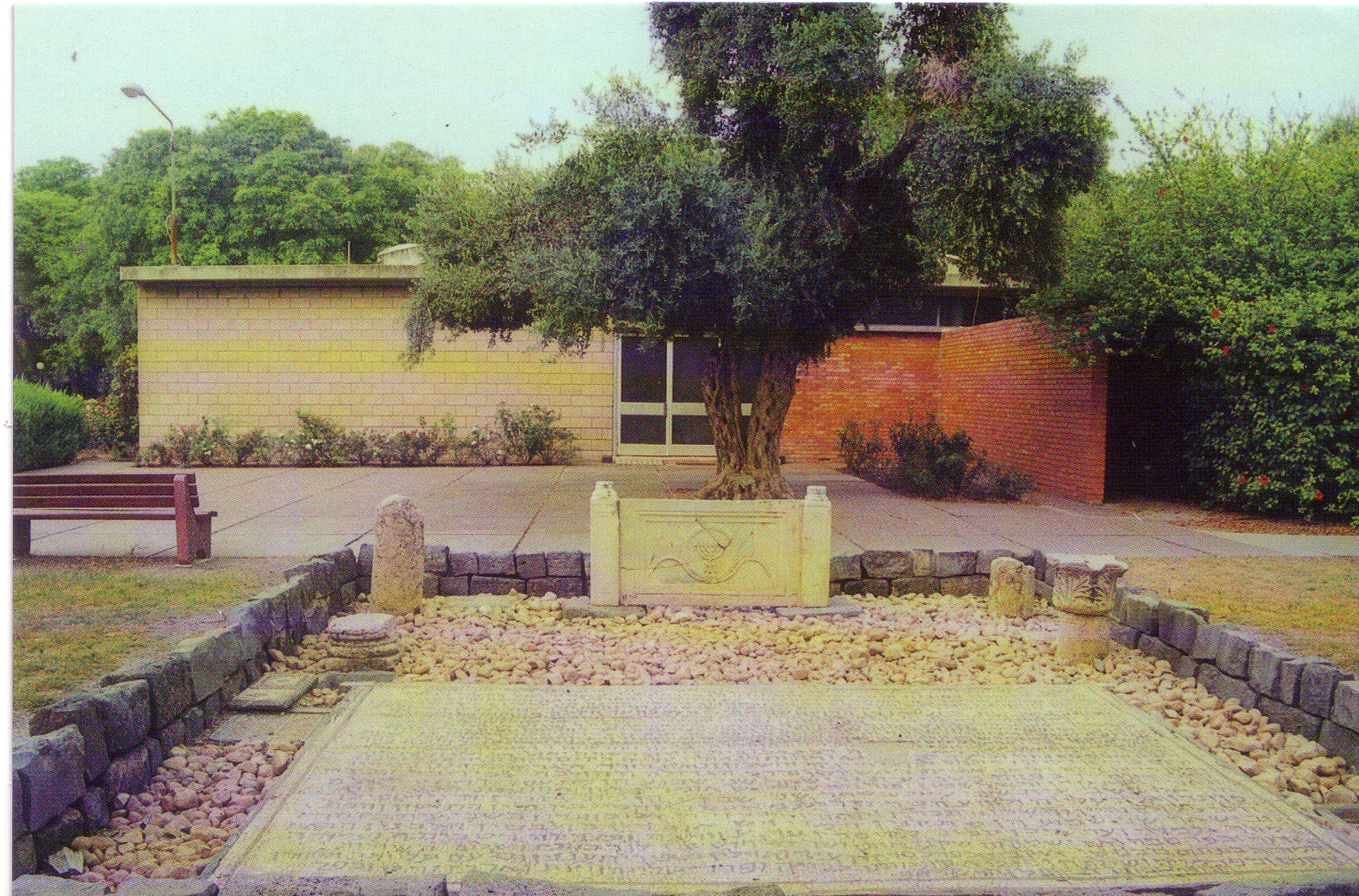
Replica of the mosaic at Kibbutz Ein Hanatziv

The text in the Reḥob mosaic is best understood in the context of Jewish law at the time, which required the tithing of agricultural produce six years out of a seven-year cycle, as well as the observance of Seventh Year law strictures on the same produce once in every seven years.

The underlying principle in Jewish law states that when the exiles returned from the Babylonian captivity in the sixth century BCE, the extent of territories resettled by them in Galilee and in Judea did not equal nor exceed the territory originally conquered by the Israelite people according to the biblical book of Joshua, more commonly referred to as "those who came-up from Egypt." The eight regions described by the mosaic are: the area of Scythopolis (now Beit She'an) and the Jordan Valley, Susita (Hippos) and its neighbouring settlements on the east bank of the Sea of Galilee, Naveh (now Nawa, Syria) in the Roman province of Arabia Petraea, Tyre, Lebanon and its neighbouring cities to the south, the Land of Israel proper, the cities of Paneas and Caesarea Maritima, and finally villages in the vicinity of Sebaste.

The practical bearing of this restructuring of boundaries (although still part of the biblical Land of Israel proper) (Note: As argued by Ishtori Haparchi (2007), pp. 40, 42. Although Rashi in BT Hullin 6b (s.v. את בית שאן כולה) says that Beit She'an was not part of the Land of Israel, Ishtori Haparchi argues that the sense here is to places not settled by the Returnees from Babylon, although they had been reportedly conquered by Joshua, and which places have only the technical name of "outside the Land of Israel," just as it is seen with Akko in BT Gittin 76b. Likewise, Beit She'an was said to have been subdued by Israel during the time of Joshua, forcing its inhabitants to pay tribute unto Israel (BT Hullin 7a on Judges 1:27–28 Archived 16 May 2017 at the Wayback Machine), but that the Returnees from Babylon did not take up residence there.) meant that places then settled by gentile residents in the land (whether Phoenicians, Syrians, Greeks, or otherwise) and not taken by Israel were not deemed as consecrated land. (Note: As explained by Menachem Meiri in his Beit HaBechirah (Hullin 6b, s.v. בית שאן), although Ishtori Haparchi (Kaftor Vaferach) disputes this, saying that the land was always consecrated, but that the laws regarding the land differed with Israel's return from the Babylonian exile.) Therefore, fruits and vegetables grown in such places and purchased by Jews were exempt from the laws of tithing, and of Seventh Year restrictions. However, if fruits and vegetables were purchased by gentile vendors from Israelites in their respective places and transported into these non-consecrated places in order to be sold in the marketplaces, they were still made subject to tithing as demai-produce by prospective Jewish buyers.

Beit She'an was a frontier city along the country's eastern front with Transjordan, and since it was not initially settled by Israelites upon their return from Babylon (although later Israelites had joined the local inhabitants (Note: Purely from a historical context, several ancient and late historical records corroborate the recent settlement of Jews in Beit She'an (Scythopolis), and which gave rise to the city's halakhic status, as defined in the mosaic inscription. During the reign of Ptolemy II, Beit She'an was renamed Scythopolis, said to be the result of a unit of Scythian cavalry serving in the army of Ptolemy II that settled there. The Book of Maccabees (2 Macc. 12:29–31) notes that, during the military campaigns of Judas Maccabeus, late-coming Jews resided in the city of Scythopolis with non-Jewish residents who treated them kindly. However, conditions quickly deteriorated during the military campaigns of Judas' brother, Jonathan Maccabee, who waged war against the Seleucid general Typhon at Beit She'an (Scythopolis) (1 Macc. 12:39–53), when Jonathan was slain. By the time of John Hyrcanus (135–104 BCE), the Jewish nation retook the city from its foreign protector, Antiochus Cyzicenus, and expelled all its foreign residents. The event is alluded to in Megillat Taanit, in the Midrash Rabba (Canticles Rabba 8:7 [11], in the Jerusalem Talmud (Soṭah 9:13 [45b]), in the Babylonian Talmud (Soṭah 33a), in Josephus (Antiquities 13.10.2–3.), as well as in Ishtori Haparchi's Kaftor ve-ferach (vol. 1, ch. 7). Josephus goes on to mention a population of above 13,000 Jews in Beit She'an at the outset of the war with Rome in the second half of the 1st century CE (The Jewish War 2.18.3.).)) all home-grown fruits and vegetables there were made exempt from tithing in the days of Judah HaNasi. Rabbi Judah HaNasi also made Beit Gubrin exempt from tithes and from the seventh-year observance, since that stretch of country had been settled by the Idumaeans (Esau's descendants) when the Jewish people returned from the Babylonian captivity.

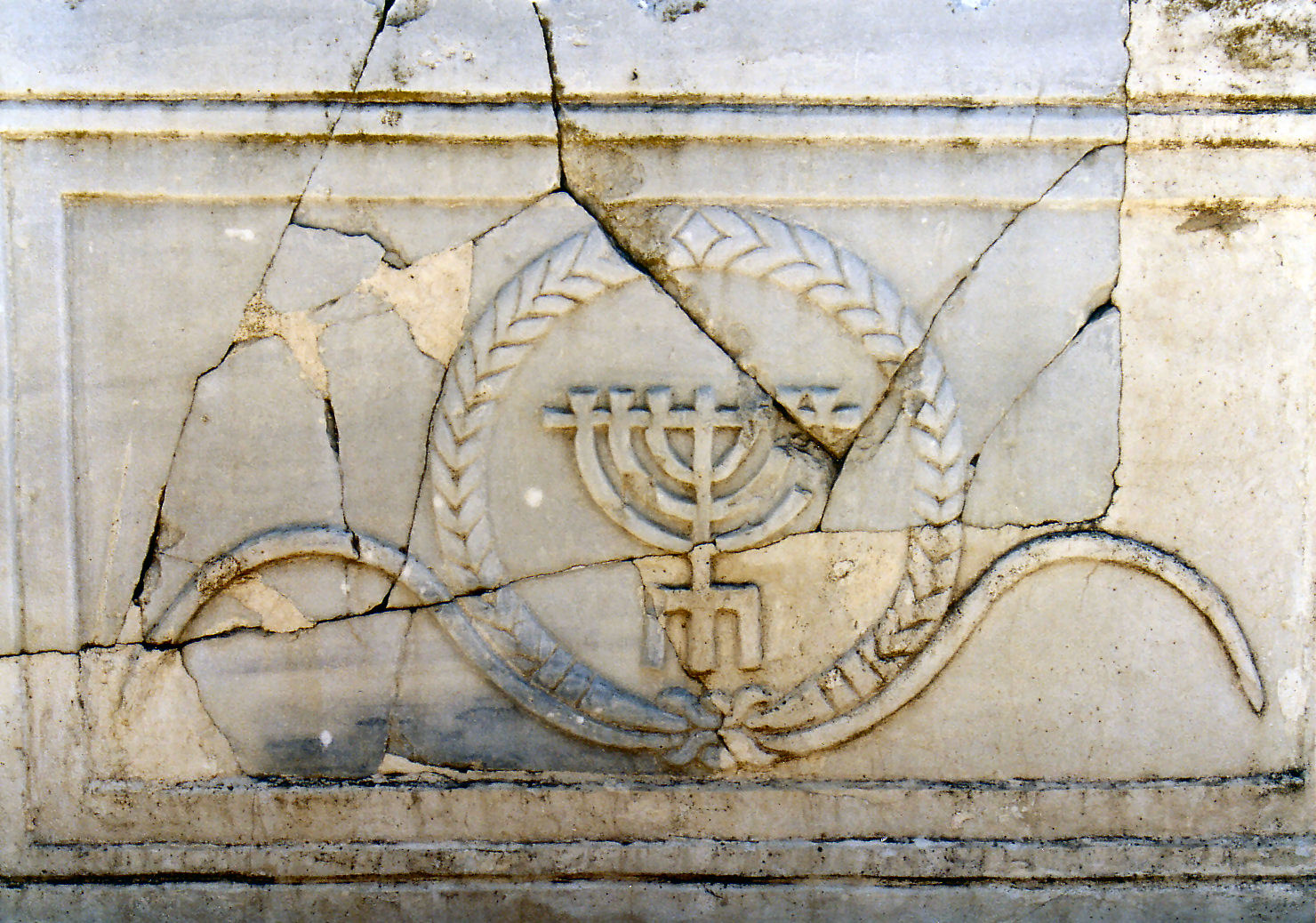
A marble screen with menorah relief at the Tel Rehov ancient synagogue

== Translation of ancient text ==
Shalom. These fruits are forbidden in Beit She'an during the Seventh Year, but during other years of the seven-year cycle they are tithed as demai-produce: cucumbers, (Note: The Hebrew word used is הקישואין (ha-qishū'īn), a word that has since changed in meaning, but which had the original connotation of "cucumbers," as explained by Maimonides' commentary on Mishnah (Terumah 8:6), and just as it is found in the Aramaic Targums of Numbers 11:5 = בוציניא / קטייה, which words, in both cases, are explained by Smith 1903, pp. 39, 500, as meaning "cucumbers." Rabbi Saadia Gaon, in his Judeo-Arabic translation of the Pentateuch, uses the Arabic word אלקת'א (Ar. القثاء) for the same fruit, meaning "cucumbers," believed by scholars to have been the Armenian cucumber, or related varieties, such as Cucumis melo convar adzhur, and what is now known as al-fāḳḳūs in Arabic.) watermelons, muskmelons, (Note: The Hebrew word used here is a Greek loanword, המלפפונות (ha-melephephonot; sing. melephephon). The Jerusalem Talmud (Kilayim 1:2) relates an ancient belief that if one were to take a seed from a watermelon and a seed from an apple, and then place them together in an impression made in the earth, the two seeds would fuse together and become diverse kinds. "It is for this reason," says the narrator of the Talmud, "that they call it (i.e. the fruit) by its Greek name, melephephon. The old Greek word for "melon" was actually μήλο = mêlo(n) apple + πεπόν = pépōn melon, meaning literally "apple-shaped melon" (see: Random House Webster's College Dictionary, s.v. melon). This fruit, muskmelon (Cucumis melo), was thought to be a cross-breed between a watermelon and an apple. Maimonides, however, calls "melephephon" in Mishnah Kilayim 1:2 and Terumah 8:6 by the Arabic name, al-khiyyar, meaning "cucumbers" (Cucumis sativus) – far from being anything related to apples and watermelons. Talmudic exegete, Rabbi Solomon Sirilio (1485–1554), disputed Maimonides' view in his commentary on the Jerusalem Talmud (Kila'im 1:2, s.v. קישות), saying that Maimonides explained "melephephon" to mean in Spanish "pepinos" = cucumbers (Cucumis sativus), which, in the opinion of an early Mishnaic exegete, Rabbi Isaac of Siponto (c. 1090–1160), was really to be identified as “small, round melons” (Cucumis melo), since Rabbi Yehudah in our Mishnah holds that it is a diverse kind in relation to kishūt (a type of cucumber). Moreover, had the "melephephon" simply been a subspecies of kishūt, explained by Maimonides as having the meaning of al-fakous (Egyptian cucumber = Cucumis melo var. chate), in the Arabic language, they would not have been considered diverse kinds with respect to each other, similar to a black ox and a white ox that plough together are not considered diverse kinds. Nevertheless, today, in Modern Hebrew, the word melephephon is now used to denote "cucumbers," based on Maimonides' identification. Cf. Kapah, E. (2007), p. 74; Zohar Amar (2012), p. 79.) parsnip (carrots), (Note: The Hebrew word used here is האסטפליני (ha-esṭafulīnī), being a Greek loanword (σταφυλῖνος), meaning carrot (Daucus carota). Cf. Tosefta (Uktzin 1:1). Amar 2000, p. 270, cites physician and botanist Ibn al-Baitar (1197–1248), and his identification of flora described by Dioscorides, in Ibn al-Baitar's seminal work; see Ibn al-Baitar 1989, pp. 230–231 (chapter 3, section 49), and where he writes that this word can mean either the wild carrot, or cultivated carrot. The word was also used to describe the "white carrot," or what is now called in English parsnip (Pastinaca sativa). Ibn al-Baitar, who lived and worked in the Levant during the Ayyubid period, mentions "eṣṭafulīn" as being the carrot, so-called in the dialect spoken by the inhabitants of al-Shām (i.e. the region of Syria). The old Hebrew word for carrot is found in Tosefta Uktzin 1:1, but also in the Jerusalem Talmud (Maaserot, ch. 2; Hallah, 4 (end); Kila'im, ch. 1).) mint that is bound by itself, the Egyptian broad beans that are bound with reed grass, (Note: The Hebrew word שיפה = shifah is translated here, in our text, as "reed grass", based on the definition of this word given by medieval Talmudic exegete, Hai Gaon, in his commentary on the Mishnah (Kelim 9:8), published in Mishnayot Zekher Chanokh (משניות זכר חנוך) (in Hebrew). Vol. 11 (Taharoth). Jerusalem: Vagshal Publishing Ltd. 2011. p. 133 (s.v. של שיפין). OCLC 1140888800., and who described shifah as being "reed grass; sedge." Since this section of the mosaic is repeated in the Jerusalem Talmud (Demai 2:1), the same definition given by Hai Gaon is provided also in the commentaries of Solomon Sirilio and Pnei Moshe on the Jerusalem Talmud (Demai 2:1), both explaining the word shifah as meaning "a kind of sedge" (מין גמי) or "sedge" (גמי), respectively. Solomon Sirilio (ibid.) goes on to explain that freshly grown Egyptian broad beans (pōl ha-miṣrī) that are found in the marketplace of Beit She'an and which are not bound by the leaves of sedge or reed grass is a sign that they are locally grown produce, and exempt from tithing. If, however, they were bound or tied in leaves of sedge, it is a sign that they were brought from outside the bounds of Beit She'an and must be tithed as demai-produce.) wild leeks (Note: The Hebrew word used here is הקפלוטות (ha-qaflūṭot), a word explained in the Jerusalem Talmud (Kilayim 2:1) as meaning "wild leeks," and by Nathan ben Abraham as "Syrian leeks" (Judeo-Arabic: אלכראת אלשאמי). This may refer to Allium ascalonicum, or to Allium ampeloprasum, but especially to Allium ampeloprasum var. kurrat. The latter herb is called in Arabic, in the dialect spoken in Palestine, karrāth berri (=wild leek). Amar 2015, p. 146 wrote that the qaflūṭot may refer to either Allium porrum or to Allium ampeloprasum.) between Shavuot and Hanukkah, (Note: Explained by Rabbi Ze'ira in the Jerusalem Talmud (Demai 2:1) who said that wild leeks were prohibited in Beit Shean until tithed, because the majority of wild leeks brought into the Beit Shean marketplace during these months (May–December) were those wild leeks grown in other places of the country which required tithing and the observance of Seventh Year restrictions (per after growths).) the seed kernels, (Note: The Hebrew word used here is הזירעונין, and refers principally to vegetable seeds, such as chickpeas (Cicer arietinum), or white peas (Lathyrus sativus), but not to cereal grains, as explained by Maimonides (1963), s.v. Kilayim 3:2, when describing the זרעונים of the previous Mishnah (ibid. 3:1) Cf. Maimonides (1967), s.v. Kelim 3:2.) black cumin, (Note: The Hebrew word used here is הקצע (ha-qeṣaʿ), more commonly spelled הקצח (ha-qeṣaḥ), since the Hebrew characters `ayin and ḥet were often interchanged in the Palestinian dialect. Cf. Pesikta de-Rav Kahana 1949, p. 162b, note 110 (§ 25, s.v. Shuvah)) sesame, mustard, rice, cumin, dried lupines, (Note: The Hebrew word used here is התורמסין (ha-tūrmosīn), a plant that is endemic to the hill-country of Judea. One of the more common species of lupine in the Land of Israel is Lupinus pilosus, and its large bean-like seed is ready for gathering in mid-summer. The seeds, though edible, require leaching several times in boiling water to cure them from their acidity and to render them soft. Once cured, they are served salted and peppered on a platter. On the use of its seeds in Palestine, see Dalman (2020), p. 321.) large-sized peas (Note: Possibly, beans (Marcus Jastrow). The Hebrew words used here are האפונין הגמלונין (ha-afūnīn ha-ğimlōnīn), explained by Maimonides (1963), s.v. Kilayim 3:2, as meaning "large-sized peas." The Jerusalem Talmud (Demai 2:1), when speaking about the same peas, says that they were black in color (possibly, Vigna mungo). In any rate, these were to be distinguished from the ordinary pea (Pisum sativum). In Modern Hebrew, אפונים is understood as meaning garden pea (Pisum sativum). However, in old Hebrew, the word אפונים, as explained by Maimonides (1963), s.v. Peah 3:3 and Shabbat 21:3, meant garbanzo beans (Cicer arietinum), and where he uses the Judeo-Arabic word אלחמץ (garbanzo beans) for this plant. However, according to one of the oldest Mishnah commentaries now at the Jewish Theological Seminary of America, in which it preserves the commentaries of Rabbi Nathan (President of the Academy in Eretz Israel during the 11th century), the word אפונים also had the equivalent meaning of the Arabic word الكشد, meaning stringed beans Vigna nilotica (see: Kapah 2007, p. 25).) that are sold by measure, garlic, scallions (Note: The sense here is to spring onions.) of the city that are sold by measure, grape hyacinths, (Note: Shahar 2000, p. 278 (note 11). The Hebrew word used here is הבולבסין (ha-būlḇosīn), meaning the Grape hyacinth (Muscari commutatum), endemic to Israel; a pleasant flowering plant with bulbous roots that are eaten fresh or pickled after boiling several times (see Method of Preparing). The plant was formerly cultivated in the hill country of Judea, and used also as an ornamental or for use in perfume. Other species of the grape hyacinth endemic to Israel are Muscari parviflorum and M. neglectum. The Hebrew word is a Greek loanword, derived from βολβός, an edible bulbous plant described in Theophrastus' Enquiry into Plants. Cf. Bos & Käs 2016, p. 218 (note 156), s.v. tassel hyacinth. Conversely, the plant here mentioned could have also referred to Astoma seselifolium, known locally by the name balbeson and whose bulbs were collected and roasted to be eaten (see: Ḳrispil, Nissim (1983). A Bag of Plants (The Useful Plants of Israel) (in Hebrew). Vol. 1 (A.-G.). Jerusalem: Cana Publishing House Ltd. pp. 84–87. OCLC 959573975., s.v. Astoma seselifolium (אסתום)).) late-ripening dates, wine, [olive] oil, on the Seventh Year the seventh-year laws apply [to them]; on the [other] years of the seven-year cycle, they are tithed as demai-produce, and [if there was] a loaf of bread, the Dough portion (Heb. ḥallah) is always [separated from it]. (Note: The separation of the Dough portion is mentioned with respect to Beit She'an on account of a rule that applies to places outside of the Land of Israel, namely, whenever one wishes to bake a quantity of bread in those places (including Beit She'an which was not initially settled by those who returned from Babylonia), one is to remove the Hallah (dough portion), from the baked bread, provided that the quantity of flour that was kneaded came to ca. 1.67 kilograms (3.7 lb). One small loaf is to be removed from the batch and designated as Hallah and burnt, while another small loaf from the same batch, being non-consecrated bread, is given to a small child of the priestly stock and eaten by him, so that the practice of giving the Hallah will not be forgotten amongst Israel. For the laws governing this action, see: Ishtori Haparchi (2007), p. 32. (cf. Halakhot Gedolot, vol. 3 of the Makitzei Nirdamim edition, ed. Ezriel Hildesheimer, "Hilkot Ḥallah", Jerusalem 1987, p. 400).)

[Excursus: The agricultural products named above were not cultivated in Beit She'an, but were brought into the city by donkey drivers (either Jewish rustics or non-Jews) who had bought them from Jewish planters in other regions of the country (Note: That is to say, the country settled by Israelites upon their return from the Babylonian captivity.) to be sold in the marketplace of Beit She'an. To this list can be added the special fruits peculiar to the Hebrew nation and mentioned in Mishnah (Demai 2:1), if perchance they were acquired by a Jew from his fellow co-religionist who was unskillful in the laws of his countrymen, such as a cultivar of dates grown only in Israel, (Note: Formerly, dates (Phoenix dactylifera) grown in the Land of Israel were renowned for their high-quality, both, in sweetness and in moisture content. A nearly 2,000 year-old date pit retrieved from Masada was recently germinated in Israel, and DNA studies revealed that the cultivar, although not the same, was very similar to the Egyptian Hayani (Hayany) cultivar, a date that is dark-red to nearly black in color, and soft. (See: Miriam Kresh (25 March 2012). "2000-Year-Old Date Pit Sprouts in Israel". Green Prophet Weekly Newsletter. Archived from the original on 18 May 2012.).) cakes of dried figs that were prepared strictly in Israel, and carob-fruit of a quality found only in Israel. In this case, they too would require the removal of the tithe known as demai. All other fruits and vegetables cultivated in Beit She'an would have been exempt from tithing altogether; when Rabbi Judah HaNasi permitted the eating of vegetables in the Seventh Year in Beit She'an, it was a release from the Seventh Year obligations and the release from tithing all produce throughout the remaining six years of the seven-year cycle.]

(Translation of text - con't.)

These are the places that are permitted in the vicinity of Beit She'an: (Note: Sussmann (1974), pp. 99 [12]–100 [13], notes that Beit She'an was permitted by Rabbi Judah HaNassi, because Beit She'an and its immediate area was not settled initially by Jews returning from the Babylonian captivity. The Rehob mosaic concerns itself with those places which have the same status as Beit She'an owing to their proximity to Beit She'an, meaning, if local Jewish husbandmen or gardeners should happen to grow their own produce, or if buyers should happen to buy locally grown produce from others, such fruits and vegetables are permitted to be eaten by them and others without tithing them, and without the strictures normally associated with Seventh Year produce.) southward, that is to say, [from] the Gate of Ḳumpōn (Note: Weiss (2000), p. 40. Jastrow (2006), p. 1386 (s.v. קמפון), explains the word's etymology, saying that it is a Greek loanword (Greek: χάμπος), having the connotation of a "plain for exercise and amusement." Text: פילי דקמפון (pillei dekumpon); the Aramaic word used for gate פילי is also a Greek loanword, πύλη (pillei = gate) + ד (de = the genitive case of) + קמפון (ḳumpon = ḳumpon). The word ḳumpon is used in Mishnah Kelim 23:2, s.v. קומפון. Etymologically, Rabbi Hai Gaon explains its import as meaning: "a [level] field where kings entertain themselves" (i.e. in the presence of their soldiers), hence: "Gate of the open field." Maimonides, writing similarly, says that it has the connotation of a "stadium, where the king's soldiers would show-off their valor and good horsemanship by riding their horses while standing upon the stirrups". Rabbi Hillel ben Eliakim of Salonika (12th century CE) explained the word קומפון in the Sifrei of Deuteronomy as meaning, "hippodrome in the Greek language in which all the people enter.") extending as far as the White Field; (Note: The name of this place is written in Aramaic, חקלה = field + חיורתה = white (White Field).) from the west, that is to say, [from] the Gate of Zayara extending as far as the end of the pavement; from the north, that is to say, the Gate of Sakkūtha extending as far as Kefar Ḳarnos, while Kefar Ḳarnos [itself] is deemed as Beit She'an; (Note: Meaning, the butts and bounds of Beit She'an and its special laws of release from tithing of produce, &c. apply to the village of Kefar Ḳarnos as well, making its inhabitants as the citizens of Beit She'an in this regard.) and from the east, that is to say, the Gate of the Dung-spreaders (Note: Sussmann (1974), p. 117 [30]. The name of this place is written in Aramaic, פילי = gate + ד = the genitive case of + זבלייה = the dung spreaders. This last word, "dung spreaders," is the same word used in Midrash Rabba (Canticles Rabba 1:9): "Said Rabbi Elʻazar: In all my days, no man has ever gone into the House of Study before me. Neither have I ever left a man sitting there by himself while I departed. Once, I rose up [from my sleep] and I found those that spread manure (Aramaic: זבלייה) [in their fields] and those that mowed hay [who had already risen up before me to do their work], etc.") extending as far as the monument of Fannuqatiah, (Note: The Hebrew word used in the mosaic inscription for monument is "nefesh" (נפש), and which word's late Hebrew meaning is explained by medieval scholar and Talmudic exegete, Rabbi Hai Gaon, in his commentary on the Mishnah (Seder Ṭaharot, Ohelot 7:1), as meaning "burial monument". Likewise, Sussmann (1974), p. 117 [30] explains the same word, saying that it means "mausoleum.") while the Gate of Kefar Zimrin and the Gate of the marshland, in those places that are within the gate, [what is grown] is permitted, but beyond [the gate without, what is grown] is prohibited. (Note: Meaning, the release from tithes applies to them as well only where produce is grown within the village walls.) The towns that are prohibited in the region of Sussitha (Hippos) (Note: Yeivin 1955, p. 165. Meaning, the town that once stood 3 km. east of the lower eastern shore of the Sea of Galilee, also known as Qalʻat el-Ḥuṣn. Although no extant records have survived showing Israel's early settlement in Hippos (Sussitha) immediately following their return from Babylonia, the novelty of this late teaching is that, although this part of the country was partly settled by Israel during their return from Babylonia, by the late 1st century CE, it was mostly populated by a non-Jewish majority, as also evidenced by an ancient historical account relayed by Josephus (The Jewish War 2.18.5.), who relates how the Syrians of that place persecuted the Jews during the First Jewish–Roman War. Elsewhere, Josephus (Antiquities xvii.xi.iv) writes that in the days of Herod Archelaus (died c. 18 CE), Hippos was already a Grecian city. According to Ishtori Haparchi 2004, p. 69, a discrepancy is found in the Tosefta. In one place (Ohelot 18:4) it says: "Towns that are swallowed-up in the Land of Israel, such as Sussitha and her neighboring towns, [or] Ashqelon and her neighboring towns, even though they are exempt from tithing and from the law of Seventh Year produce, they do not fall under the category of [defilement by] the land of the gentiles," but in another place (Tosefta, Shevi'it 4:10) it says: "The towns that are obligated in what concerns tithes in the region of Sussitha, etc." In one place it says they are exempt, but in another place it says they are obligated. Ishtori Haparchi (ibid.) attempts to rectify the discrepancy by saying that "region" (in Shevi'it) and the "neighboring towns" (in Ohelot) have two distinct halakhic implications. The "neighboring towns" (in Ohelot) refer to non-Jewish towns (such as Sussitha) stretching along the periphery of Israel's borders; the word "region" (in Shevi'it) refers to Jewish towns in the region of Sussitha. In any rate, by saying "towns that are prohibited," the Rehob inscription requires tithing in such places.) [are as follows]: 'Ayyanosh, 'Ain-Ḥura, (Note: According to Sussmann 1974, p. 122 [35], 'Ain-Ḥura corresponds with the misspelled ʻAin Teraʿ (עין תרע) in the Leiden MS. of the Jerusalem Talmud, and with ʻAin Tedaʿ (עין תדע) in the Rome MS. of the Jerusalem Talmud, but like his predecessors before him (Avi-Yonah and Lieberman), Sussmann fails to offer any tentative identification of the site, except to say that it might be related to Enhaddah in Joshua 19:21. In any regard, there is a destroyed village that bears the same name of 'Ain-Ḥura in the upper Golan Heights, ca. 16 kilometers (9.9 mi) east of where the Hasbani River, and the Dan and Banias tributaries converge to form the Jordan River. In the Rehob mosaic, as Sussmann points out, the name is written as one word, עינחרה.) Dambar, 'Ayūn, (Note: Possibly referring to a destroyed village by that name and which formerly stood 2 kilometers (1.2 mi) from 'Ain-Ḥura in the upper Golan Heights, some 14 kilometers (8.7 mi) east of the confluence of the Banias, Dan and Hasbani Rivers, which form the upper Jordan River. The town was known by its Arab inhabitants as 'Ayūn al-Ḥajal (ca. 3 kilometers (1.9 mi) south of Buq'ata). There was also a farm by the same name, Al 'Ayūn (Al 'Uyūn) (32.718647°N 35.667908°E) in the southernmost end of the Golan Heights, situated ca. 4.8 kilometers (3.0 mi) east of the Sea of Galilee at its southern end, and ca. 1.2 kilometers (0.75 mi) north of the Yarmuk River. This latter place is described by Schumacher 1888, pp. 97–99.) Ya'arūṭ, Kefar Yaḥrīb, Nob, Ḥisfiyyah, Kefar Ṣemaḥ; now the Rabbi (Judah HaNasi) permitted Kefar Ṣemaḥ. The towns that are of a dubious nature in the region of Naveh [are as follows]: Ṣeir, Ṣayyer, Gashmai, Zayzūn, Renab and its ruin, Igorei Ḥoṭem, and the fortified city (kerakh) of the son of Harag.

[Excursus: The import of detailing the above frontier towns and villages was to show the boundaries of the Land of Israel as retained by the Jews who returned from the Babylonian captivity. Where agricultural produce was prohibited from Jews living in these areas, this implies that these places were originally part of those places settled by the returnees from Babylon. Since the land was consecrated by their arrival in those parts, all fruits and vegetables were prohibited until the time that they could be tithed, and the land was required to lie fallow during the Seventh Year. However, where the places were designated as "dubious," this is explained in the Tosefta (Shevi'it 4:8) as meaning that initially these places were permitted (as there was no requirement to tithe produce grown in these places). Later, Jewish leaders made all fruits and vegetables in these places prohibited until they were first tithed.]

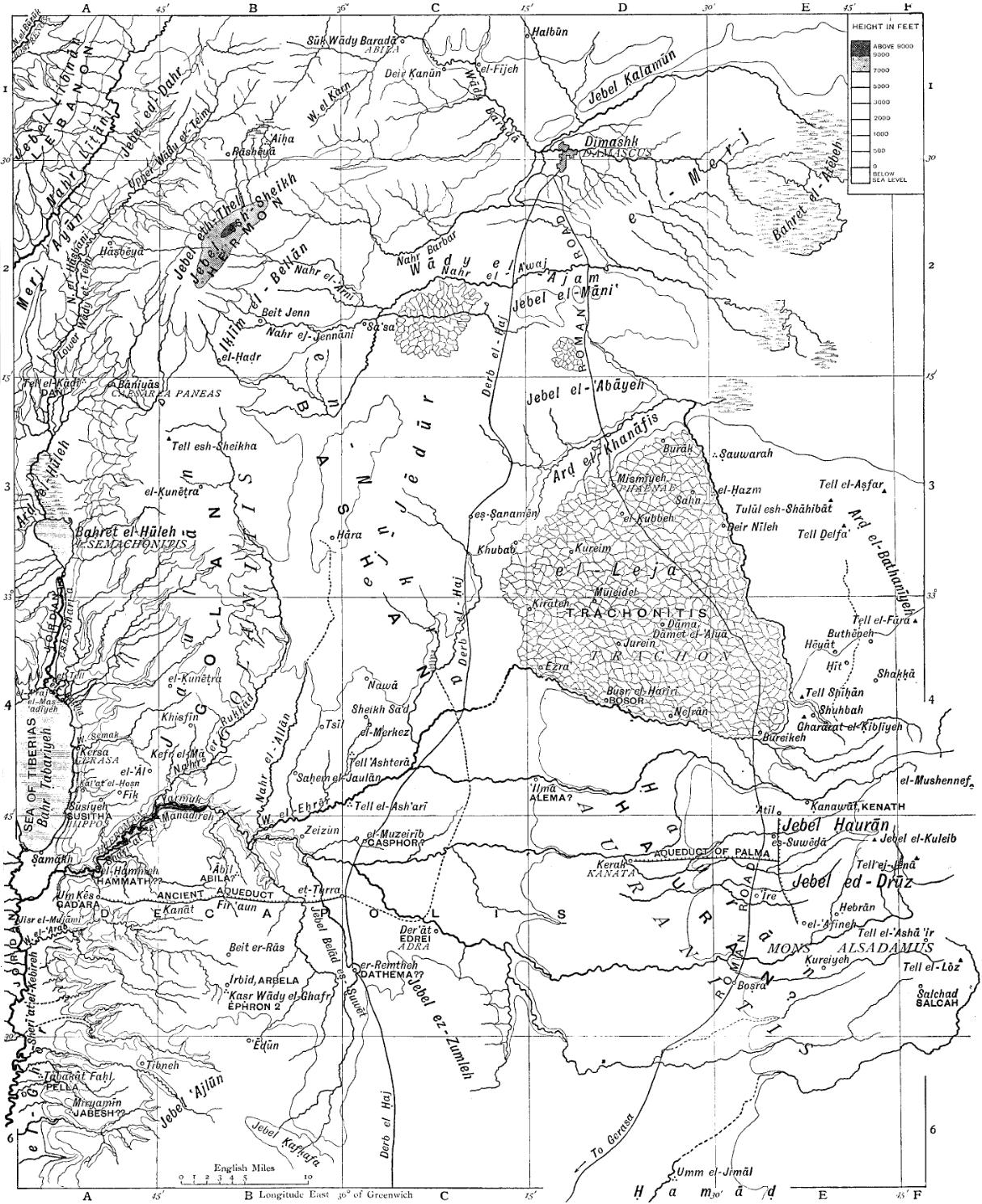
Map of locations east of the Sea of Galilee

=== Regulation of produce between Achziv (Chezib) and Tyre ===
The maritime city of Akko (Ptolemais), and the river south of Achziv (Chezib), (Note: On the far western coastline, the precise place marking the extent of the boundary of Eretz Israel in the vicinity of Chezib was understood to be the River below Chezib (i.e. Nahr Mefshukh, or what is now called Naḥal Ga'athon), in accordance with a teaching in Tosefta (Shevi'it 4:6): "Which is the Land of Israel? From the river south of Achzib, etc." The river (Nahr Mefshukh) is shown in the Palestine Exploration Fund map Archived 15 January 2023 at the Wayback Machine produced in 1878. As one moved further east of this place, the border extended northward.) a small coastal town ca. 15 kilometers (9.3 mi) north of Akko, according to the Mishnah (Demai 1:3 and Gittin 1:2), were the extent of the northern boundary settled by Jews returning from the Babylonian captivity in the days of Ezra. (Note: A view largely held by many, including by Ishtori Haparchi 2004, p. 69 (note 120). Although the butts and bounds of Akko were mentioned to imply that bills of divorce written there must be done in the presence of competent witnesses, see the Babylonian Talmud (Gittin 76b), where it states that whenever the Rabbis would escort their companions northbound, they would only go with them as far as Akko, so as not to leave the border of the country taken by the Returnees from Babylonia. Nevertheless, part of the country taken by the Returnees from Babylon also bypassed Akko to the right-hand side, and extended as far as Achziv (Chezib) to the north, just as it is explained in the Tosefta (Ohelot 18:14): "He that walks [northbound] from Akko to Chezib, from his right-side towards the east the route is pure in terms of [defilement from] land of the gentiles, and he is obligated in what concerns the tithe and Seventh Year produce, until it becomes known [to him once again] that it is exempt; but from his left-side towards the west the route is defiled in terms of land of the gentiles, and [such produce] is exempt from tithes and from the laws governing the Seventh Year, until it becomes known [to him once more] that it is obligated, until he reaches Chezib." The same Baraita is quoted in the Jerusalem Talmud, (Shevi'it 16a). On the Palestine Exploration Fund Map Archived 14 March 2016 at the Wayback Machine of 1878, the coastal city of Achziv is written there by its Arabic name, ez-Zīb.)

Produce locally grown in the country beyond Achziv was exempt from the rules of demai-produce, but if purchased from Achziv itself, it required tithing. Although the towns and villages (listed below) were traditionally outside of the territorial bounds occupied by Jews returning from Babylonia, these cities nevertheless attracted Jewish settlement. (Note: As evidenced by Rabbi Ami in the Jerusalem Talmud (Rome MS.) on Demai 2:1, when referencing these same cities between Akko and Tyre.) In addition, fruits and vegetables grown in the Land of Israel were often transported northward, along the route known as the Ladder of Tyre (Jewish Palestinian Aramaic: סולמיה דצור sûləmith dəṢûr). Israelites who frequented these areas, or who had moved there, were likely to buy fruits that had not been properly tithed in Israel, or had been marketed during the sabbatical year.

(Translation of text - con't.)

The towns that are prohibited in the region of Tyre [are as follows]: Shaṣat, Beṣet, Pi Maṣūbah, the Upper Ḥanūtha, (Note: The text of the Rehob inscription reads: חנותה עלייתה (Ḥanūtha 'aliyatha), meaning literally, "the upper shop." In the 19th century, the site was a ruin called Khurbet Hanuta, located a little northeast of el-Baṣṣeh, and shown in the Palestine Exploration Fund Map Archived 14 March 2016 at the Wayback Machine made by Lieut C. R. Conder & HH Kitchener in May 1878, and described in SWP:Memoirs. In 1938, a Kibbutz was built on the ancient site, now called Hanita, along the Israeli-Lebanese border in northern Israel.) the Lower Ḥanūtha, (Note: The text of the Rehob inscription reads: חנותה ארעייתה (Ḥanūtha arʻeitha), meaning literally, "the lower shop". See previous note for its location.) Bebarah, Rosh Mayya, 'Ammon, Mazih which is the Castle, and all which an Israelite has bought is prohibited. (Note: Solomon Sirilio, in his commentary on the Jerusalem Talmud (Demai 2:1), published in the 2010 Oz ve'Hadar edition, p. 17b, and which carries a parallel text of the Rehob mosaic, states that fruits and vegetables found in these regions are forbidden until they are tithed, since they were most-likely transported there by donkey drivers who came from places in the Land of Israel proper. According to a Tosefta (Ma'aser Rishon 3:8), a rabbinic ordinance prohibited taking out untithed fruits and vegetables from the Land of Israel, and any of such fruits and vegetables that are taken outside of the country for selling to gentiles are presumed to be untithed.)

=== Boundary of the Land of Israel in the 5th c. BCE ===
The following frontier cities once marked the boundary of the Land of Israel, or the extent of places repopulated after the return from Babylonian exile. In a broader sense, the list of frontier towns and villages herein named represent the geographical limits of regulations imposed upon all agricultural produce, making them fully liable to tithing and to sabbatical-year restrictions within that same border, or, in the event of being purchased from the common people of the land, to separate therefrom only the demai-tithe. As one moved further east of Achziv, the border extended northward, into what are now portions of south Lebanon, and as far east as places in the present-day Kingdom of Jordan. While the settlements here named reflect a historical reality, bearing heavily on Jewish legal law (Halacha), they did not always reflect a political reality.

(Translation of text - con't.)

The boundaries of the Land of Israel, [that is to say], the place h[eld] by those returning from Babylonia, [are as follows]: The passage of Ashkelon, the wall of Sharoshan Tower [of Caesarea], (Note: The Rehob mosaic has inscribed חומת מיגדל שרושן (wall of Sharoshan Tower), without the words "of Caesarea." The completion of this text is based on a conflation of the Rehob mosaic with its parallel text found in the Tosefta (Shevi'it 4:11), which latter places the Sharoshan Tower in Caesarea (חומת מגדל שרשן דקיסרי). Joseph Patrich, in Temples of Herodian Caesarea, p. 181, suggests that the name Sharoshan may have actually been a name of derision for a Canaanite goddess and applied to the city of Caesarea, or what Josephus calls "Straton's Tower" (Στράτωνος Πυργὸς). See Josephus (1981), s.v. Antiquities 15.9.6. Archived 2022-01-05 at the Wayback Machine (p. 331). The copyist of the Leiden MS. of the Jerusalem Talmud (from which text all modern copies of the Jerusalem Talmud were printed), while copying his own manuscript from an older version had at his disposal, seemed to have been unsure about the proper rendering of the word Sharoshan, or else made use of a corrupt text, and wrote in reference to the same place: חומת מגדל שיד ושינה, dividing the word Sharoshan into two words, viz. "the wall of the Tower of Sīd and Shinah.") Dor, (Note: The coastal city of Dora, ca. 8 kilometers north of Caesarea Maritima.) the wall of Akko, the source of the spring of Ǧiyāto and Ǧiyāto itself, Kabri[tha], [B]eit Zanitha, the Castle of Galilee, Quba'ya of Ayata, Mamṣi’ of Yarkhetha, Miltha of Kurayim, Saḥratha of Yatī[r], [the riveri]ne brook of Baṣāl, Beit 'Ayit, Barashatha, Awali of Battah, the mountain pass of 'Iyyon, Massab Sefanḥa, the walled city of B[ar-Sa]nnigora, the Upper Rooster of Caesarion, Beit Sabal, Ḳanat, Reḳam, Trachonitis (Note: Gaube 1982, p. 593. Text: טרכון, the usual designation for a wide area east of the Golan Heights (Gaulonitis), including what is now called Lajat.) [of] Zimra which is in the region of Buṣrah, Yanqah, Ḥeshbon, (Note: Boraas, et al. (1979), p. 10. Today, the site is a ruin bearing its old namesake, Tell Ḥesbān, located 16 road miles southwest of Amman, and ca. 9 kilometers (5.6 miles) north of Madaba, in the plains east of the Dead Sea.) the brook of Zered, Igor Sahadutha, Nimrin, (Note: Jastrow 2006, p. 914 (s.v. נמרה) explains that it is also called בית נמרין, and that its modern name is Nimrin, located in Peraea (End Quote). Today, the village is now a ruin in present-day Jordan, located approximately 12 kilometers (7.5 miles) north of the Dead Sea and 16 kilometers (9.9 miles) east of Jericho. The village is also mentioned by Josephus (1981), s.v. The Jewish War 4.7.4–5 (p. 538), as being inhabited by Jewish insurgents during the War with Rome.) Melaḥ of Zayzah, Reḳam of Ǧayāh, (Note: Anecdote: The name Reḳam, without the epithet "of Ǧayāh," is mentioned in the Mishnah (Gittin 1:2). According to the Mishnah, Reḳam (Petra) marked the extent of the eastern bounds of the Land of Israel, but it did not include Reḳam itself.) the Gardens of Ashkelon and the great road that leads into the desert. These are the fruits that are prohibited in Paneas on the sabbatical-year, (Note: Meaning, an Israelite who lives in this frontier city, a city near to Syria in the far northwest of the country, such fruits are to be deemed as coming from Israel proper, rather than from Syria, since these fruits are typically grown in Israel proper and supplied to the border cities (Jerusalem Talmud, Demai 2:1, P'nei Moshe; p. 17a in the 2010 Oz ve'Hadar edition). So long as the like produce is still growing in the Upper Galilee, these fruits may be eaten by him during the sabbatical-year, but he is not permitted to harvest them in their regular fashion. Moreover, once this produce has begun to wither in the fields, the gathered produce of that same species must be discarded from one's house - that is, be eaten forthwith, or burnt or thrown into the sea (Maimonides).) but in the remaining years of the seven-year cycle they are tithed entirely as demai-produce: Rice, walnuts, sesame, Egyptian broad beans, [and] there are those who also say early ripening Damascene plums, lo! These are [all] to be treated on the Seventh Year as seventh-year produce, (Note: That is, with respect to their removal when the growing season has ended, and the prohibition of aftergrowths.) but in the remaining years of the seven-year cycle they are tithed as produce that has certainly been left untithed, and even [had they been brought] from the Upper Rooster and beyond.

[Excursus: Jose ben Joezer of Ẓareda and Jose ben Yoḥanan of Jerusalem decreed defilement in respect of the country of the gentiles (BT, Shabbat 14b), meaning that the priests of Aaron's lineage should not venture beyond the borders of Israel. In doing so, they risk becoming defiled by corpse-uncleanness and, in turn, defile their offerings (which must needs be eaten by them in a state of ritual purity). Ashkelon was long deemed as one of such cities, as it was settled by gentiles and not conquered by Jews upon their return from the Babylonian exile. The Jerusalem Talmud (Shevi'it 6:1) relates how Rabbi Phinehas ben Jair, a priest of Aaron's lineage, and others with him, used to go down into the marketplace of the Saracens in Ashkelon to buy wheat during the Seventh Year, and return to their own city, and immerse themselves in order to eat their bread (Terumah) in a state of ritual purity.]

=== Caesarea Maritima ===
The maritime city of Caesarea was an enclave along the Mediterranean coast not immediately settled by Jewish émigrés returning from the Babylonian exile. Later, however, Jews joined the inhabitants of the city. In the 1st century CE, it was still principally settled by foreigners, mostly Grecians. (Note: For the city's non-Jewish population during the period of the 1st-century CE, see Josephus (1981), The Jewish War (2.14.4; 3.19.1).) To ease the strictures placed upon the poor of the Jewish nation during the Seventh Year (since planting was prohibited throughout that year, and after-growths could not be taken by the people), Rabbi Judah HaNasi (2nd century CE) released the city (and its bounds) from the obligation of tithing locally-grown produce, and from the restrictions associated with Seventh Year produce. (Note: To release Caesarea from the obligation of tithing its locally grown produce implies that Caesarea was not settled initially by those returning from the Babylonian captivity. Yet, elsewhere in the mosaic, it states explicitly that the "wall of Sharoshan Tower," which is in Caesarea, was one of the bounds of the Land of Israel and that it was originally settled by Israelites returning from the Babylonian captivity. To rectify this apparent contradiction, Erlich (1993:70) wrote that, in his opinion, "Archelaus [sic] received [from Augustus Caesar] the old part of Caesarea, while the maritime port was taken away from his jurisdiction. The part given to Archelaus [sic] was considered the Land of Israel, distinct from that area situated west of the wall of the new city" (End Quote).) Nevertheless, on certain products, the separation of the demai tithe was still required.

(Translation of text - con't.)

These fruits are tithed as demai-produce in Caesarea: wheat and [if] bread stuffs the dough-portion is always removed, but as for wine and [olive] oil, dates, rice and cumin, lo! These are permitted during the Seventh Year in Caesarea, but on the remaining years of the seven-year cycle they are mended by separating [only] the demai tithe. Now there are some who prohibit [eating] white-petal grape hyacinths that come from the King's Mountain. (Note: Shahar 2000, p. 295 [21]. A large tract of country, incorporating all of the hill-country of Judea and western Samaria, and viewed as Israel proper since its territory was traditionally settled by Jews at the time of Ezra, known in Hebrew as Har ha-Melekh (Heb. הר המלך). According to Samuel Klein, the name Har ha-Melekh is inextricably connected with Ptolemy's agrarian-centralized regime, i.e. agricultural holdings in Judea and Samaria and their leasing to tenant workers (Shahar 2000, p. 303). The Jerusalem Talmud (Demai 2:1) explains that in Caesarea during the seventh year, the majority of this cultivar of hyacinth was brought there from other regions of the country, and since it is prohibited for a Jew to trade in seventh year produce, the bulbs of this herb are forbidden to buy. On the King's Mountain, see Mishnah Shevi'it 9:2. The Jerusalem Talmud (Vat. ebr. 133, fol. 68v) on Tractate Demai, ch. 2, mentions the same teaching, with a slight recension to the text, namely, that bulbosin (cultivar of hyacinth) are forbidden to take from Caesarea, although the Vat. ebr. 133 Ms. does not call it by the adjective "white" bulbosin.) Unto which place [is it considered] 'within the parameters' of Caesarea? Unto Ṣuwarnah and the Inn of Ṭabitha and [the Inn of] 'Amuda, (Note: Effectually translated as "the Inn of the Column." Place unidentified. The Jerusalem Talmud (Demai 2:1), however, clarifies that in all places where if one were to stand outside of Caesarea and still see the waters of the sea, that place is considered within the environs of Caesarea and bears the same status as Caesarea.) and Dor and Kefar Saba, (Note: The only other ancient reference to the name "Kefar Saba" (Text: כפר סבה), besides the Rehob mosaic and the Jerusalem Talmud, appears in the writings of the Jewish historian, Josephus (1981), s.v. Antiquities 16.5.2. Archived 15 January 2023 at the Wayback Machine (p. 343), and ibid. 13.15.1. Archived 15 January 2023 at the Wayback Machine (p. 286). Josephus wrote that the town Kefar Saba was renamed Antipatris by King Herod after his father, Antipater. Under Arab-rule, its name was changed to Ras el 'Ain. Cf. Jerusalem Talmud, Demai 2:1 (8a). Solomon Sirilio explains in his commentary on the Jerusalem Talmud (Demai 2:1) that these five places, namely: Ṣuwarnah, the Inn of Ṭabitha, the Inn of 'Amuda, Dor and Kefar Saba, have all the same status as Caesarea, and are permitted, since they were not conquered by Israel upon their return from Babylonia.) and if there is any place purchased by an Israelite, (Note: That is to say, in the place settled originally by foreigners.) our masters (i.e. the rabbis) are apprehensive concerning it [i.e. in what concerns the requirement to separate tithes]. Shalom. (Note: The conclusion of this treatise, meaning "Peace!" and which archaeologist, Fannie Vitto, speculates may have originally been a letter written to the community in Rehob, outlining for them the laws touching on agricultural produce and tithing, as there were signs of an identical inscription that was inscribed in ink on a plastered wall in the synagogue, but which may have been recopied later and inlaid in the mosaic floor in the foyer of the synagogue. This would explain the mosaic's opening and closing with the words "Shalom.")

=== Addendum: Permitted towns in region of Sebaste ===
Between the regions of Judea and Galilee in Palestine lay an intermediate stretch of land known as "the strip of the Samaritans.", (Note: The enclave inhabited by Samaritans. Cf. Jerusalem Talmud (Ḥagigah 3:4) and Babylonian Talmud (Ḥagigah 25a). These are said to have converted to Judaism in later years, but again ostracized by mainstream Judaism. Still, in what concerns tithes, they were obligated to abide by such laws, although in reality they often neglected its practice. Compare the Tosefta (Kelim - Baba Metzia 6:10), where it speaks of a Gaba in Samaria, belonging to the Samaritans, saying: "They did not mention the pomegranates of Bāden nor the leeks of Jabaʻ of the House of the Samaritans (Heb. Kūthīm) except to say that they are tithed as produce [that went] certainly untithed.") also known as "Samaria", Jews often passed through the region, while en route from Galilee to Jerusalem during the three annual pilgrimages, and again when returning home.

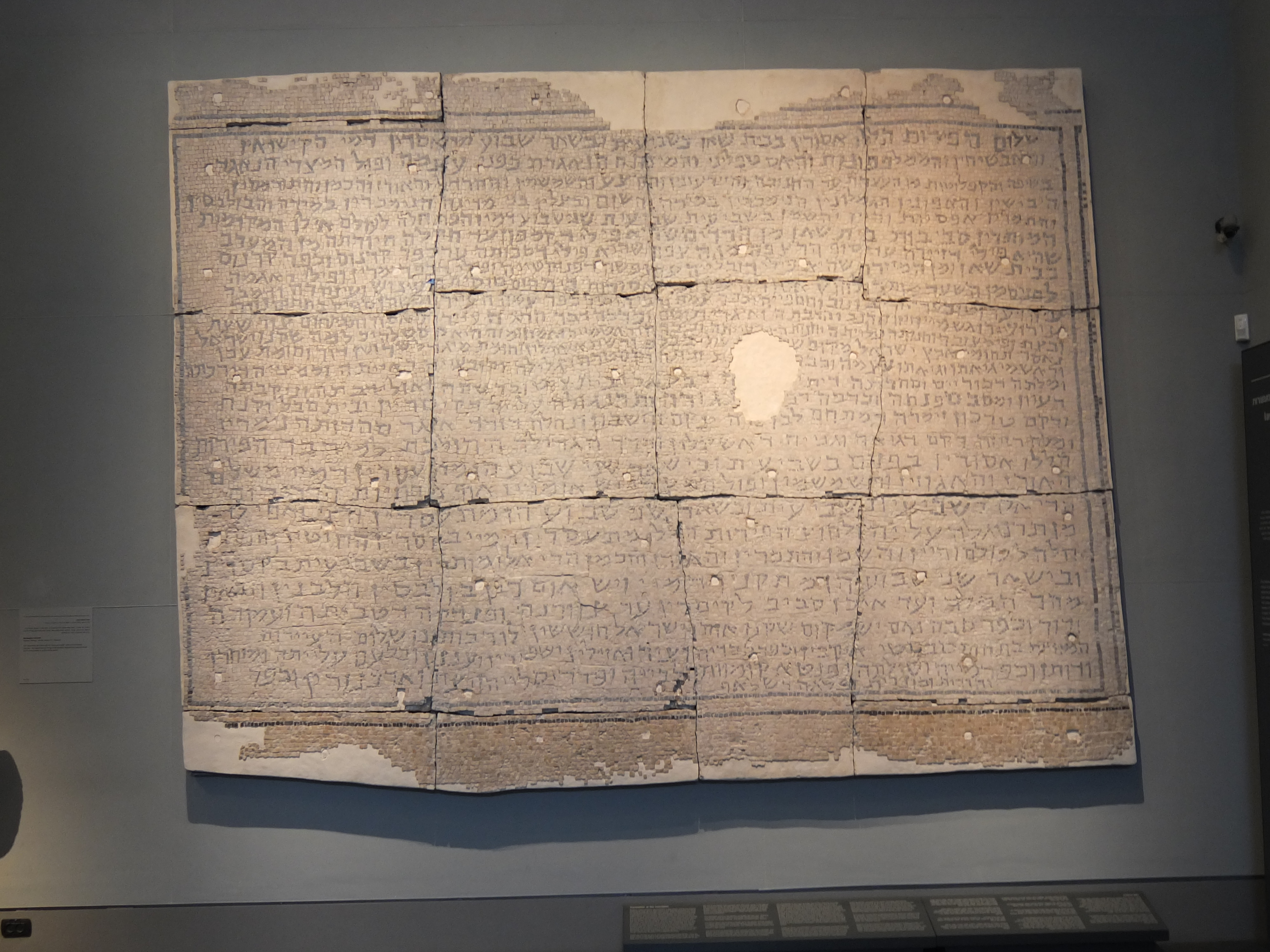
The mosaic at the Israel Museum in Jerusalem (before its reconstruction)

Although the region of Samaria was not seized at the very outset by those Jews returning from the Babylonian exile, (Note: See Jamitovsky 2004, p. 37 who cites Megillat Taanit, where it alleges that the Samaritans would not allow them to do so in the beginning, until at length (on the 25th of the lunar month Meraḥšǝwan) the Returnees from Babylonia went to Shomron (later called Sebaste) and there settled, building a wall around that place, and later being joined by other Jewish villagers who established yet other towns and who were given the term "grafted cities" (Heb. ערי נברכתא).) the priests of Aaron's descent were still permitted to pass through that section of the country, without fear of experiencing defilement in respect to the country of the gentiles. Nonetheless, there were some places in Samaria that were exempt from tithes, as if they had been a foreign land.

The Jerusalem Talmud, when speaking about the impropriety of leaving the Land of Israel, describes the standard rule of practice of the time: "Said Rabbi Abbahu: 'There are hamlets belonging to the Samaritans wherein it has been customary to permit [a Jew's passage through them], since the days of Joshua, the son of Nun, and they are permitted' (i.e. released from the laws requiring tithing of produce)."

The reason for this exemption is explained by Talmudic exegete, Solomon Sirilio, as being that these villages in Samaria and their suburbs had the status of feudal or usufruct lands given by grant from the state to farm-laborers. This was enough to exempt such produce from the requirement of tithing, since the kingdom (Ptolemaic, Roman, or otherwise) had not forfeited its hold over such lands, and since the Jewish regulations for tithing prescribe that produce or grain that is to be tithed must be the property of its tither. The following list of towns concerns those hamlets held by the state in the region of Sebaste (the biblical city of Samaria) and which were, therefore, exempt from the laws of tithing. (Note: Other villages (here unnamed) are assumed to not have been under the same leniency, such as those places that were privately owned and inhabited by either Samaritans or Jews. Their agricultural products would have required being tithed.) The list is not known from any other source, and is only alluded to in the Jerusalem Talmud.

(Translation of text - con't.)

The towns that are permitted in the region of Sebaste [are as follows]: Iḳbin, Kefar Kasdiya, 'Ir (sic), Azeilin, Shafīrīn, 'Ananin, the Upper Bal'am, Mazḥaru, Dothan, Kefar Maya, Shilta, Penṭāḳūmewatha, Libiya, Fardeseliya, Yaṣat, Arbanūrin, Kefar Yehūdit, Mūnarit, and half of Shelāf.

In Jewish Mishnaic law, the Samaritans were obligated to separate tithes from their produce, and where they were negligent, Jews who purchased such fruits and vegetables were required to separate the tithes before they could be eaten. (Note: It should be noted, however, that the status of the Samaritans gradually changed, and they were later considered to be non-Jews. See Schiffman (1985), p. 324.) The towns in Samaria that were exempt from tithing have been understood to mean that they were farmsteads owned by non-Jewish landlords, which made the fruits grown in those villages permitted to be taken in the Seventh-year and in other years (see supra). Yaakov Sussmann holds that they were "typically Grecian towns." In contrast, the Mishnah, compiled by Rabbi Judah HaNassi in 189 CE, mentions other cities and towns of Samaria, such as Badan and Gebaʻ, that require tithing of produce.

== Practical bearing ==
By virtue of the long historical reality, Jewish law operated for many years as a living legal system under the auspices of the sovereignty of foreign governments with their own legal systems. Throughout all these years, Jews were beholden to their ancient laws, and to the principle that the Land of Israel remains eternally under special sanctity – thus, obligating the Jewish people at all times to separate the agricultural tithes and to observe the laws of the Sabbatical year and its first fruits, regardless of the geopolitics of the country, or what names people attach to the country. All these laws are contingent upon the country's ancient boundaries, when the returning Jewish exiles resettled the country after the Babylonian captivity.

Original Hebrew-Aramaic transcript

שלום הפירות הללו אסורין בבית שאן בשביעית ובשאר שבוע מתאסרין (Note: Instead of writing מתעסרין [= mitʿasrīn], the copyist wrote מתאסרין [= mitāsrīn], which although both have nearly the same sound, the words carry different connotations. The way that it is written in the mosaic does not fit with the continued sentence, which latter proves the writer's intent. The sentence can only make sense with its correction. Sussmann, the primary scholar who worked on the mosaic, has pointed out this fact, and he has even noted where the Jerusalem Talmud (Berakhot 2:4) states that there has long been a problem with people who cannot correctly differentiate between the "aleph"-sound and the "ʿayin"-sound. Often, speakers and writers will interchange "aleph" (א) with "ʿayin" (ע), which has happened in our text.) דמי הקישואין והאבטיחין והממלפפונות והאסטפליני והמינתה הנאגרת בפני עצמה ופול המצרי הנאגד בשיפה והקפלוטות מן העצרת עד החנוכה והזירעונין והקצע והשמשמין והחרדל והאורז והכמן והתורמסין היבישין והאפונין הגמלונין הנימכרין במידה והשום ובצלין בני מדינה הנימכרין במידה והבולבסין והתמרין אפסיות והיין והשמן בשביעית שביעית שני שבוע דמי והפת חלה לעולם אילו המקומות המותרין סביבות בית שאן מן הדרום שהיא פילי דקמפון עד חקלה חיורתה מן המערב שהיא פילי דזיירה עד סוף הרצפה מן הצפון שהיא פילי דסכותה עד כפר קרנוס וכפר קרנוס כבית שאן ומן המיזרח שהיא פילי דזבלייה עד נפשה דפנוקטייה ופילי דכפר זמרין ופילי ראגמה לפנים מן השער מותר ולחוץ אסור העיירות האסורות ביתחום סוסיתה עינוש ועינחרה ודמבר עיון ויערוט וכפר יחריב ונוב וחספייה וכפר צמח ורבי היתיר כפר צמח העיירות שהן ספיק בתחום נווה ציר וצייר וגשמיי וזיזון ורנב וחרבתה ואיגרי חוטם וכרכה דבר הרג העיירות אסורות בתחום צור שצת ובצת ופימצובה וחנותה עלייתה וחנותה ארעייתה וביברה וראש מייה ואמון ומזה היא קסטלה וכל מה שקנו ישראל נאסר תחומי ארץ ישראל מקום שה[חזיקו] עולי בבל פורשת אשקלון וחומת מיגדל שרושן דור וחומת עכו וראש מי גיאתו וגיאתו עצמה וכבר[תה וב]ית זניתה וקסטרה רגלילה וקובעייה ראייתה וממצייה דירכתה ומלתה דכוריים וסחרתה דיתי[ר ונחל]ה דבצאל ובית עיט וברשתה ואולי דבתה וניקבתה רעיון ומסב ספנחה וכרכה רב[ר ס]נגורה ותרנגולה עלייה דקיסריון ובית סבל וקנת ורקם טרכון זימרה דמתחם לבוצרה ינקה זחשבון ונחלח דזרד איגר סהדותה נימרין ומלח רזיזה רקם דגיאה וגנייה דאשקלון ודרך הגדולה ההולכת למירבר הפירות הללו אסורין בפנים בשביעית ובישאר שני שבוע הן מתעסרין דמיי משלם האורז והאגוזין והשמשמין ופול המצרי יש אומרין אוף אחוניות הבכירות הדי אלו בשביעית שביעית ובשאר שני שבוע הן מתעסרין וריי ואפילו מן תרנוגלה עלייה ולחוצ הפירות הללו מתעסרין דמיי בקסרין החיטין והפת חלה לעולם והיין והשמן והתמרין והאורז והכמן הרי אלו מותרין בשביעית בקסרין ובישאר שני שבוע הן מתקנין דמיי ויש אוסרין בולבסין הלבנין הבאין מהר המלך ועד איכן סביב לקיסרין עד צוורנה ופנדקה דטביתה ועמודה ודור וכפר סבה ואם יש מקום שקנו אותו ישראל חוששין לו רבותינו שלום העיירות המו<ת>דות בתחום סבסטי איקבין וכפר כסדיה ועיר ואזילין ושפירין ועננין ובלעם עלייתה ומזחרו ודותן וכפר מייה ושילתה ופנטאקומוותה ולבייה ופרדיסלייה ויצת וארבנורין וכפר יהודית ומונרית ופלגה דשלאף

== See also ==
- Impurity of the land of the nations
- Laws and customs of the Land of Israel in Judaism
- Yom tov sheni shel galuyot
- From Dan to Beersheba
- Shmita
- Tithes in Judaism
- Turos Amanus
- Zodiac synagogue mosaic

== Bibliography ==
- Abel, F.M. (1933). Géographie de la Palestine (in French). Vol. 1. Paris. OCLC 216266367.
- Aharoni, Y., ed. (n.d.), "Kadesh-barnea", Encyclopaedia Biblica, vol. 7
- Ahituv, S. [in Hebrew] (1981). "The Lebanon, Galilee and Bashan in a Topographical List of Amenhotep III". Eretz-Israel: Archaeological, Historical and Geographical Studies. 15 (Y. Aharoni Memorial Volume): 129–136. JSTOR 23619427.
- Alexandre, Yardenna (2017). "Horbat Parva: Final Report". Hadashot Arkheologiyot – Excavations and Surveys in Israel (HA-ESI). 129. Israel Antiquities Authority. Archived from the original on 15 January 2023.
- Amar, Z. (2000). Agricultural Produce in the Land of Israel in the Middle Ages (in Hebrew). Jerusalem: Ben-Zvi Institute. ISBN 965-217-174-3. OCLC 1030796215.
- Amar, Z. (2009). "The Contribution of Arabic Sources to the Identification of Types of Plums in Ancient Israel". Lĕšonénu: A Journal for the Study of the Hebrew Language and Cognate Subjects (in Hebrew). 71 (1–2): 233–235. JSTOR 24327794.
- Amar, Z. (2012). "Flora of the Bible: a new investigation aimed at identifying all of the plants of the Bible in light of Jewish sources and scientific research", pub. by Ruben Mass, Jerusalem 2012 OCLC 783455868
- Amar, Z. (2015). Flora and Fauna in Maimonides' Teachings (in Hebrew). Kfar Darom. OCLC 783455868.
- Applebaum, Shimon (1989). Judaea in Hellenistic and Roman Times. Leiden: E.J. Brill.
- Auerbach, Shlomo Zalman (1952). "§8". Ma'adanei Eretz - Shviyis (in Hebrew) (2 ed.). Jerusalem: Beth Midrash Halacha - Moriah. pp. 86–104. OCLC 27935759., section 8: Seventh Year laws within the borders of those who came up from Egypt
- Avi-Yonah, M. (1949). Historical Geography of Palestine (in Hebrew). Jerusalem: Bialik Institute. (revised editions printed in 1951 [OCLC 187480884], in 1962 [OCLC 741065177], and in 1984 [OCLC 55535428])
- Avi-Yonah, M. (1976). Gazetteer of Roman Palestine, Qedem - Monographs of the Institute of Archaeology [5]. Vol. 2. Jerusalem: Hebrew University of Jerusalem. Archived from the original on 10 January 2023.
- Avi-Yonah, M. (1979). The Holy Land - from the Persian to the Arab Conquests (536 B.C. to A.D. 640) A Historical Geography. Grand Rapids, Michigan. ISBN 0-8010-0010-6.
- Bar-Ilan, Meir [in Hebrew] (1991). "What was the Purpose of the Tannaim in Describing the Borders of the Land of Israel? (Mipenei ma shannu ha-tanna'im gevuloteha shel eretz-yisrael)" (PDF). Teuda (in Hebrew). 7. Bar-Ilan University: 95–110.
- Ben David, Chaim (2011). Albert I. Baumgarten; Hanan Eshel; Ranon Katzoff; Shani Tzoref (eds.). The Rehov Inscription: A Galilean Halakhic Text Formula? (Halakhah in Light of Epigraphy). Göttingen: Vandenhoeck & Ruprecht. pp. 231–240. Archived from the original on 10 January 2023 – via www.academia.edu.
- Ben-Gad Hacohen, David (1998). "The Southern Boundary of the Land of Israel in Tannaitic Literature and the Bible". Cathedra: For the History of Eretz Israel and Its Yishuv (in Hebrew). 88. Yad Izhak Ben Zvi: 15–38. JSTOR 23404150.
- Boraas, Roger S.; Geraty, Lawrence T. (1979). "The Long Life of Tell Ḥesbân, Jordan". Archaeology. 32 (1): 10–20. JSTOR 41726614.
- Bos, Gerrit [in German]; Käs, Fabian (2016). "Arabic Pharmacognostic Literature and Its Jewish Antecedents: Marwān ibn Ǧanāḥ (Rabbi Jonah), Kitāb al-Talḫīṣ". Aleph. 16 (1). Indiana University Press: 145–229. doi:10.2979/aleph.16.1.145. JSTOR 10.2979/aleph.16.1.145. S2CID 171046217.
- Braslawski, J. [in Hebrew] (1942). "ʾAmmon and Mazi". Bulletin of the Jewish Palestine Exploration Society. י' (א'): 26–27. JSTOR 23726216.
- Conder, C.R.; Kitchener, H.H. (1881). The Survey of Western Palestine: Memoirs of the Topography, Orography, Hydrography, and Archaeology. Vol. 1. London: Committee of the Palestine Exploration Fund.
- Dalman, Gustaf (2020). Nadia Abdulhadi-Sukhtian (ed.). Work and Customs in Palestine, volume II. Vol. 2 (Agriculture). Translated by Robert Schick. Ramallah: Dar Al Nasher. ISBN 978-9950-385-84-9.
- Dar, Shimon (1986). Landscape and Pattern: An Archaeological Survey of Samaria 800 B.C.E.-636 C.E. Oxford: B.A.R. ISBN 0-86054-395-1.
- Demsky, A. (1979). "The Permitted Villages of Sebaste in the Reḥov Mosaic". Israel Exploration Journal. 29 (3/4): 182–193. JSTOR 27925724.
- Erlich, Michael (1993). "The Borders in the 'Baraita of the Boundaries' according to Crusader and Mamluk Sources". Proceedings of the World Congress of Jewish Studies. 11. World Union of Jewish Studies: 67–74. JSTOR 23536271.
- Feliks, Yehuda [in Hebrew] (1986). The Jerusalem Talmud (Talmud Yerushalmi) Tractate Shevi'it - Critically Edited (in Hebrew). Vol. Part 2 (2 ed.). Jerusalem: Rubin Mass Publishers. OCLC 763128279.
- Frankel, Raphael (1979). "'Bibra' — A Forbidden Village in the Territory of Tyre". Israel Exploration Journal. 29 (3/4): 194–196.
- Frankel, Raphael; Finkelstein, I. (1983). "'The Northwest Corner of Eretz-Israel' in the Baraita 'Boundaries of Eretz-Israel'". Cathedra: For the History of Eretz Israel and Its Yishuv. 27 (27): 39–46. JSTOR 23398920.
- Frankel, Rafael; Getzov, Nimrod; Aviam, Mordechai; Degani, Avi (2001). "Settlement Dynamics and Regional Diversity in Ancient Upper Galilee (Archaeological Survey of Upper Galilee)". Israel Antiquities Authority. 14.
- Freimark, Peter [in German] (1969), "Zu einigen Ortsnamen im Tosefta - Traktat Schebiit", in Wolfdietrich Fischer (ed.), Festgabe für Hans Wehr (in German), Wiesbaden: Brill, OCLC 247182030
- Gaube, H. (1982). "Ladja'". In Bosworth, C. E.; Donzel, E. van; Lewis, B.; Pellat, Ch. (eds.). The Encyclopedia of Islam, Volume 5, Fasicules 87-88: New Edition. Leiden: Brill. p. 593. ISBN 9004064710.
- Gleichen, Edward, ed. (1925). First List of Names in Palestine - Published for the Permanent Committee on Geographical Names by the Royal Geographical Society. London: Royal Geographical Society. OCLC 69392644.
- Goldhor, Isaac [in Hebrew] (1913). Adamat Kodesh, being the Land of Israel (in Hebrew). Vol. 2. Jerusalem: Yiddish Literature. OCLC 233044063.
- Haltrecht, Ephraim (1948). "Pi-ha-Masuba". Bulletin of the Jewish Palestine Exploration Society. יד (א/ב): 43. JSTOR 23727325.)
- HaReuveni, Immanuel [in Hebrew] (1999). Lexicon of the Land of Israel (in Hebrew). Miskal - Yedioth Ahronoth Books and Chemed Books. pp. 662–663. ISBN 978-965-448-413-8.
- Hildesheimer, Hirsch (1886). Beiträge zur Geographie Palästinas (Contributions to the geography of Palestine) (in German). Berlin: Rosenstein & Hildesheimer. OCLC 644315705.
- Ibn al-Baitar (1989). Ibrahim Ben Mrad (ed.). Tafsīr Kitāb Diāsqūrīdūs (in Arabic). Beirut: Dar Algharb Al'Islami. OCLC 957197903.
- Ishtori Haparchi (2004). Avraham Yosef Havatzelet (ed.). Sefer Kaftor Ve'ferah (in Hebrew). Vol. 1 (chapter 5). Jerusalem: Bet ha-midrash la-halakhah ba-hityashvut. OCLC 32307172.
- Ishtori Haparchi (2007). Avraham Yosef Havatzelet (ed.). Sefer Kaftor Ve'ferah (in Hebrew). Vol. 2 (chapter 11) (3rd ed.). Jerusalem: Bet ha-midrash la-halakhah ba-hityashvut. OCLC 32307172.
- Jamitovsky, Itzhak (2004). Changes and Developments of the Samaritan Settlement in the Land of Israel during the Hellenistic-Roman Period (in Hebrew). Ramat-Gan: Bar-Ilan University (Thesis paper).
- Jastrow, M., ed. (2006), Dictionary of the Targumim, the Talmud Babli and Yerushalmi, and the Midrashic Literature, Peabody, Mass.: Hendrickson Publishers, OCLC 614562238
- Josephus (1926). Antiquities, Loeb Classical Library, ed. H.St.J. Thackeray, Heinemann: London
- Josephus (1981). Josephus Complete Works. Translated by William Whiston. Grand Rapids, Michigan: Kregel Publications. ISBN 0-8254-2951-X.
- Kapah, El'ad (2007). The Identification of the Mishna Plants According to Rabbi Nathan's Commentary of the Mishna (in Hebrew). Ramat Gan: Bar-Ilan University.
- Klein, S. (1925). Jewish Transjordan: From the time of the Second Temple until the last century of the Middle Ages (עבר הירדן היהודי: מזמן בית שני עד המאה האחרונה של ימי הביניים) (in Hebrew). Vienna: Menorah.
- Klein, S. (1928). "Das tannaitische Grenzverzeichnis Palaestinas" (The Tannaitic Boundary Index of Palaestina)". HUCA (in German). 5.
- Klein, S. (1939). Sefer Ha-Yishuv (ספר הישוב) (The Book of the Yishuv) (in Hebrew). Vol. 2. Jerusalem: Bialik Institute. OCLC 18115508.
- Ḳrispil, Nissim (1983). A Bag of Plants (The Useful Plants of Israel) (Yalḳuṭ ha-tsemaḥim) (in Hebrew). Vol. 1 (A.-G.). Jerusalem: Cana Publishing House Ltd. OCLC 959573975.
- Lepinski, Nadav (n.d.). "Tell Maresha". In Ben-Yosef, Sefi (ed.). Israel Guide - Judaea (A useful encyclopedia for the knowledge of the country) (in Hebrew). Vol. 9. Jerusalem: Keter Publishing House, in affiliation with the Israel Ministry of Defence. OCLC 745203905.
- Levine, David (2010). "Rabbi Judah the Patriarch and the Boundaries of Palestinian Cities: A Literary-Historical Study". Cathedra: For the History of Eretz Israel and Its Yishuv (in Hebrew). 138. Jerusalem: Yad Izhak Ben Zvi: 7–42. JSTOR 23408403.
- Lieberman, S. (1976). "The Halakhic Inscription from the Bet-Shean Valley". Tarbiẕ (in Hebrew). 45 (1–2): 54–63. JSTOR 23594475.
- Löw, I. (1924–1934). Die Flora der Juden (in German). Vol. 2, 4. Vienna: R. Loewit.
- Luria, B.Tz. (1964). "Aspects of the Sea of Galilee and the location of Sussitha and Gamla". Beit Mikra (in Hebrew). 8 (1/2): 64–83. JSTOR 23499655.
- Maimonides (1963–1967). Mishnah, with Maimonides' Commentary (in Hebrew). Vol. 1–3. Translated by Yosef Qafih. Jerusalem: Mossad Harav Kook. OCLC 183905585.
- Maimonides (1974). Sefer Mishneh Torah - HaYad Ha-Chazakah (Maimonides' Code of Jewish Law) (in Hebrew). Vol. 1–7. Jerusalem: Pe'er HaTorah.
- Marcellius, R.P. Henricus (1837). Theologia scripturæ divinæ (in Latin). Paris: Bureau de la Bibliothèque ecclésiastique. OCLC 1100342776., s.v. Roob
- Mazar, A. (1999). "The 1997-1998 Excavations at Tel Rehov: Preliminary Report". Israel Exploration Journal. 49: 1–42. Archived from the original on 15 January 2023.
- Mishnah (1977). The Mishnah. Translated by Herbert Danby (12th ed.). Oxford: Oxford University Press. ISBN 0-19-815402-X.
- Muḳaddasi (1886). Guy Le Strange (ed.). Description of Syria, Including Palestine. London: Alexander P. Watt for the Committee of the Palestine Exploration Fund. OCLC 1004386.
- Nathan ben Abraham (1955), "Perush Shishah Sidrei Mishnah - A Commentary on the Six Orders of the Mishnah", in Sachs, Mordecai Yehudah Leib (ed.), The Six Orders of the Mishnah: with the Commentaries of the Rishonim (in Hebrew), Jerusalem: El ha-Meqorot, OCLC 233403923
- Neubauer, A. (1868). Géographie du Talmud (in French). Paris: Michel Lévy Frères.
- Neusner, Jacob; Sarasan, Richard S., eds. (1986). The Tosefta - Translated from the Hebrew. Vol. 1 (First Division, Zera'im - The Order of Agriculture). Hoboken, New Jersey: Ktav Publishing House. ISBN 9780870686931. OCLC 2874998.
- Onomasticon (1971), "Roōb (entry No. 766)", The Onomasticon of Eusebius Pamphili: Compared with the Version of Jerome and Annotated (PDF), translated by C. Umhau Wolf, p. Section R. The Pentateuch (digitised 2006)
- Palmer, E.H. (1881). The Survey of Western Palestine: Arabic and English Name Lists Collected During the Survey by Lieutenants Conder and Kitchener, R. E. Transliterated and Explained by E.H. Palmer. Committee of the Palestine Exploration Fund.
- Pesikta de-Rav Kahana (1949). Salomon Buber (ed.). (Pesiqata Derav Kahana) (in Hebrew). New York.
- Press, I. (1932). "Rekem". Tarbiẕ (in Hebrew). 3 (3): 328–336. JSTOR 23577173.
- Random House Webster's College Dictionary (1992), "melon", Random House Webster's College Dictionary, New York: Random House, Inc., p. 845, ISBN 0-679-41420-7
- Safrai, Z. (1977). "Marginal Notes on the Rehob Inscription". Zion: Historical Society of Israel (in Hebrew). 42 (1/2): 1–23. JSTOR 23555803.
- Schiffman, L.H. (1985). "The Samaritans in Tannaitic Halakhah". The Jewish Quarterly Review. 75 (4): 323–350. doi:10.2307/1454401. JSTOR 1454401.
- Schumacher, G. (1888). The Jaulân: surveyed for the German Society for the Exploration of the Holy Land. London: Richard Bentley & Son. OCLC 1142389290.
- Schwarz, Joseph (1969). A Descriptive Geography and Brief Historical Sketch of Palestine. Translated by Isaac Leeser. New York: Hermon Press. OCLC 255586852. (reprinted A. Hart: Philadelphia 1850)
- Shahar, Yuval (2000). "Har Hamelekh — A New Solution to an Old Puzzle". Zion (in Hebrew). 65 (3): 275–306. JSTOR 23564253.
- Smith, J. Payne (1903). A Compendious Syriac Dictionary (in Syriac). Oxford: University of Oxford.
- Sussmann, Jacob [in Hebrew] (1974). "A Halakhic Inscription from the Beth-Shean Valley". Tarbiẕ (Academic Journal) (in Hebrew). 43 (1/4). Jerusalem: Mandel Institute for Jewish Studies: 88–158. JSTOR 23593799.
- Sussmann, Jacob [in Hebrew] (1975). "The Inscription in the Synagogue at Rehob". Qadmoniot: A Journal for the Antiquities of Eretz-Israel and Bible Lands (in Hebrew). 4 (32): 123–128. JSTOR 23671631. (Jacob Sussmann)
- Sussmann, Jacob [in Hebrew] (1976). "The Boundaries of Eretz-Israel". Tarbiẕ (Academic Journal) (in Hebrew). 45 (3/4). Jerusalem: Mandel Institute for Jewish Studies. JSTOR 23594784. (Jacob Sussmann)
- Tosefta (1970). M.S. Zuckermandel (ed.). Tosephta - Based on the Erfut and Vienna Codices (in Hebrew). Jerusalem: Wahrmann Books. OCLC 13717538. (first printed in Berlin 1899)
- Tsafrir, Y.; Foerster, Gideon (1997). "Urbanism at Scythopolis-Bet Shean in the Fourth to Seventh Centuries". Dumbarton Oaks Papers. 51. Dumbarton Oaks, Trustees for Harvard University: 85–146. doi:10.2307/1291763. JSTOR 1291763.
- Urman, Dan; Flesher, Paul V.M. (1998). Ancient Synagogues: Historical Analysis and Archaeological Discovery. Vol. 1–2. Leiden: Brill. ISBN 9004102426. Vol. 2: ISBN 9004102434 (two volumes)
- Vilnay, Z. (1954). "Identification of Talmudic Place Names". The Jewish Quarterly Review. 45 (2). University of Pennsylvania Press: 130–140. doi:10.2307/1452901. JSTOR 1452901.
- Vitto, Fanny (1974). "Ancient Synagogue at Rehov". Atiqot Journal of the Israel Department of Antiquities (in Hebrew). 7: 100–104. JSTOR 23456548.
- Vitto, Fanny (1975). "The Synagogue at Rehob". Qadmoniot: A Journal for the Antiquities of Eretz-Israel and Bible Lands (in Hebrew). 4 (32): 119–123. JSTOR 23671630.
- Vitto, Fanny (2015). "Wall Paintings in the Synagogue of Rehov: An Account of their Discovery" (PDF). Israel Antiquities Authority. The Israel Museum, Jerusalem (IMSA 7).
- Weiss, Zeev (2000). "New Light on the Rehov Inscription: Identifying 'The Gate of Campon' at Bet Shean". Tarbiẕ (in Hebrew). 70 (1). Mandel Institute for Jewish Studies: 35–50. JSTOR 23601245.
- Wilson, John Francis (2004). Caesarea Philippi: Banias, the lost city of Pan. London: I.B. Tauris.
- Yeivin, S. (1955). "Archaeology in Israel (November 1951-January 1953)". American Journal of Archaeology. 59 (2). Archaeological Institute of America: 163–167. doi:10.2307/501108. JSTOR 501108. S2CID 163308052.
- Yitzhaki, Arieh [in Hebrew] (1980). "Ḥūrvat Parwah – Synagogue of 'Reḥob' (חורבת פרוה - בית-הכנסת של רחוב)". Israel Guide - Jerusalem (A useful encyclopedia for the knowledge of the country) (in Hebrew). Vol. 8. Jerusalem: Keter Publishing House, in affiliation with the Israel Ministry of Defence. OCLC 745203905.
