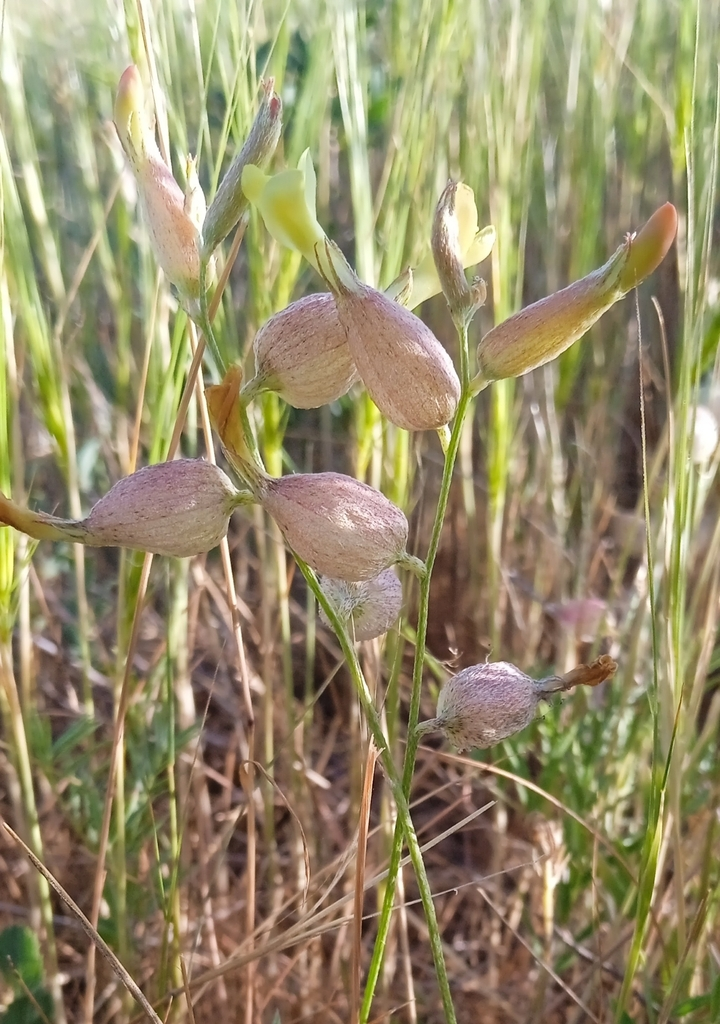

Scientific classification
- Kingdom: Plantae
- Clade: Tracheophytes
- Clade: Angiosperms
- Clade: Eudicots
- Clade: Rosids
- Order: Fabales
- Family: Fabaceae
- Subfamily: Faboideae
- Genus: Astragalus
- Species: A. xanthomeloides

Binomial name
- Astragalus xanthomeloides Korovin. & Popov.

Synonyms
- Astragalus xanthomeloides f. pseudokrauseanus Rasulova.

= Astragalus xanthomeloides =

Species of flowering plant

Astragalus xanthomeloides is a species of flowering plant in the family Fabaceae.

The species is native to Afghanistan and Central Asia (Kazakhstan, Kyrgyzstan, Tajikistan, Turkmenistan, and Uzbekistan). It is a perennial herb.

Astragalus xanthomeloides was named by Yevgeny Petrovich Korovin and Mikhail Grigorevich Popov in 1924.
