= Zayzun, Daraa =

Zayzun زيزون
- Village
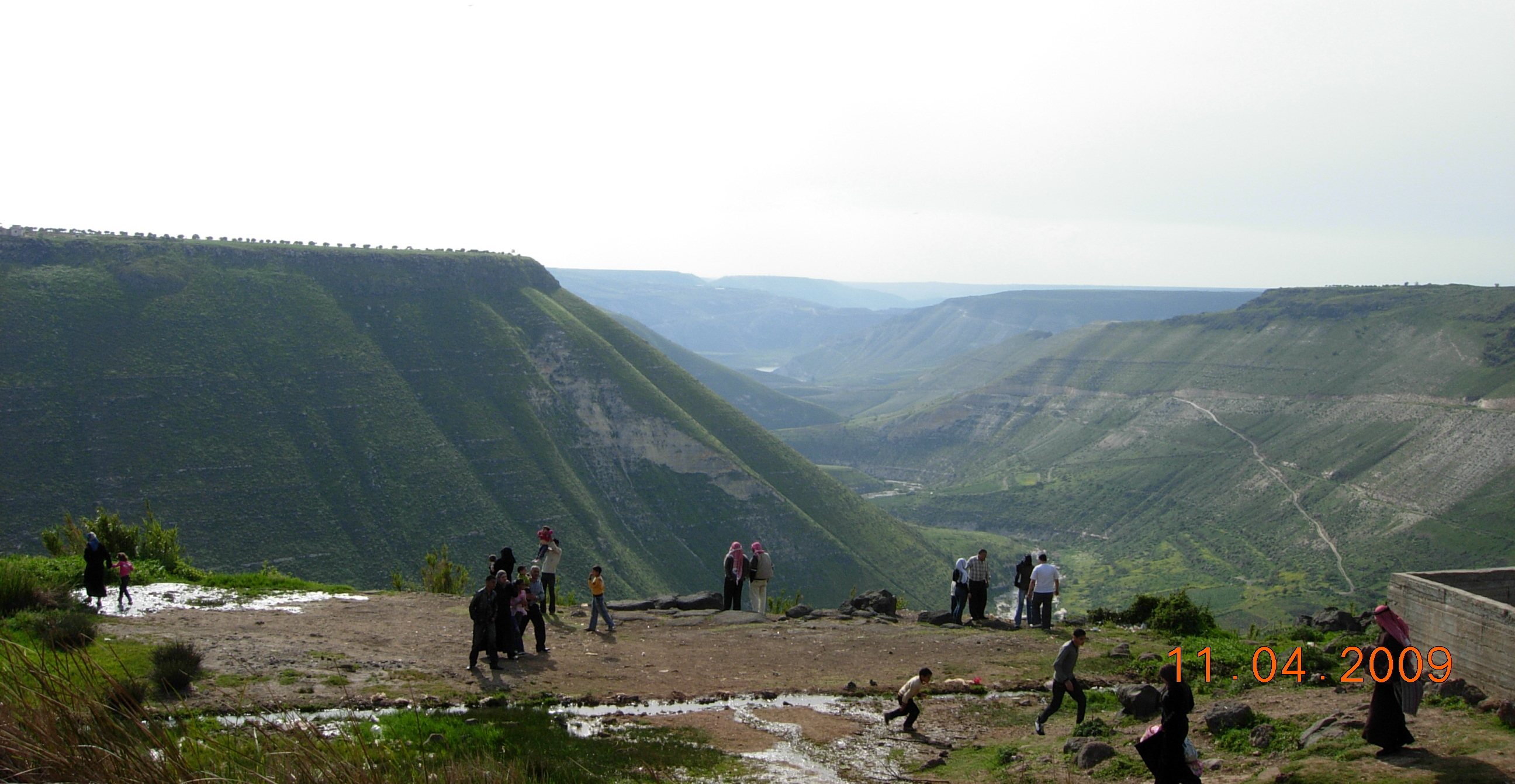
- Zayzun, 2009

- Location within Syria
- Coordinates: 32°43′15″N 35°56′36″E
- Grid position: 238/236 PAL
- Country: Syria
- Governorate: Daraa Governorate
- District: Daraa District
- Nahiyah: Muzayrib

Population (2004 census)
  - Total: 1,933
- Time zone: UTC+3 (AST)

Zayzun (Arabic: زيزون, romanized: Zayzūn; also spelled Zaizoun or Zeizoun) is a village in southern Syria, administratively part of the Daraa Governorate, and located northwest of Daraa on the Syrian-Jordanian borders. The village is famous for its waterfalls and other natural sites. According to the Syrian Central Bureau of Statistics, it had a population of 1,933 in the 2004 census.

== History ==
=== Antiquity ===
Zayzun is identified with Zeizin (Hebrew: זיזין), a Jewish village located in the territory of Naveh (modern Nawa, Syria) in the region of Batanaea. It is mentioned in Roman-era sources, including rabbinic literature and the Mosaic of Rehob.

=== Ottoman period ===
In 1596 Zayzun appeared in the Ottoman tax registers as part of the nahiya (subdistrict) of Bani Juhma in the Qada of Hauran. It had an all Muslim population consisting of 13 households and 5 bachelors. A fixed tax−rate of 25% was paid on wheat (3000 akçe), barley (900 a.), summer crops (1600 a.), goats and/or beehives (200 a.), in addition to taxes occasional revenues (200 a.); a total of 5,900 akçe.

In 1884 the American archaeologist Gottlieb Schumacher visited the village. He noted that it occupied both sides of a small lake called Bahret Zeizun, which was formed by the Zeizun waterfall. The northern side of the village stood at a higher elevation and held more importance than its southern counterpart. Gardens of pomegranates, figs and other orchards laid to the north of the village and were irrigated by the Wadi al-Ajami stream.

Schumacher noted that the village had recently flourished but had declined sharply by the time of his visit due to a blood feud between its sheikh (village headman) and the local Bedouin tribes, which forced the sheikh, his relatives and other residents to abandon Zayzun for the nearby Tell Shihab. There remained in Zayzun about 200 Muslim inhabitants, including several Africans. In all there were 55 largely dilapidated homes, all built of stone. The former sheikh's house had a courtyard and was well built but was falling into ruin.

== Syrian Railways ==
Zayzun is the last stop of the secondary route of the Syrian Railways which primarily connect Damascus to Dera'a.

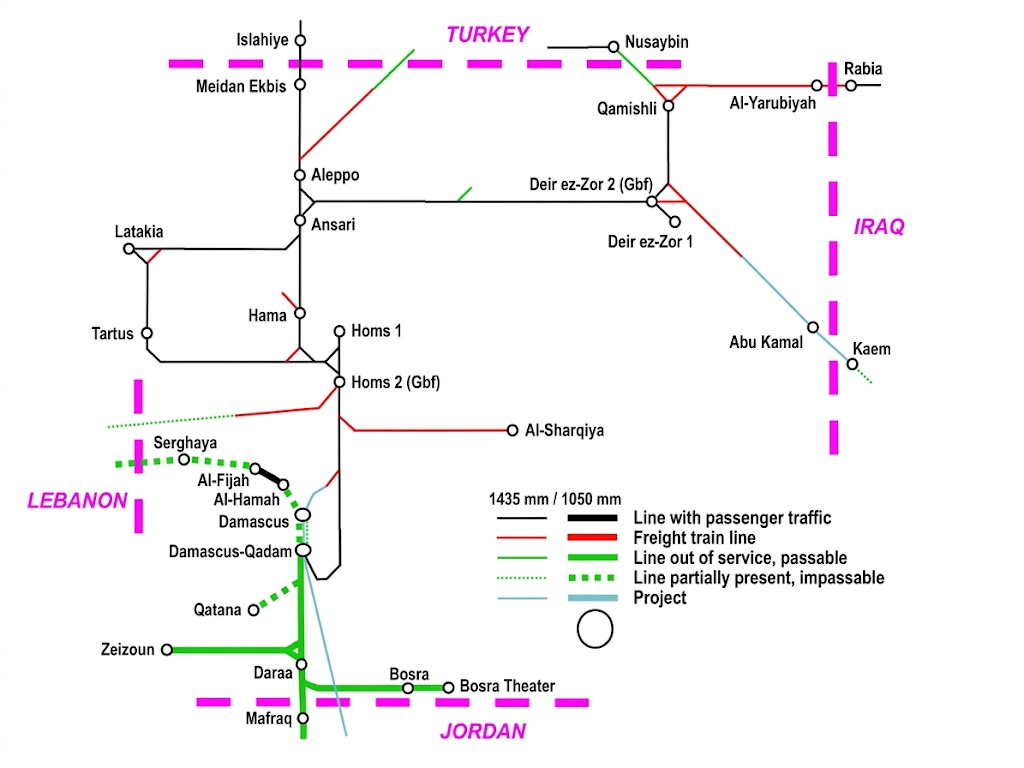
Zayzun is located on the southern route of the Syrian Railways

== Bibliography ==
- Hütteroth, W.-D.; Abdulfattah, K. (1977). Historical Geography of Palestine, Transjordan and Southern Syria in the Late 16th Century. Erlanger Geographische Arbeiten, Sonderband 5. Erlangen, Germany: Vorstand der Fränkischen Geographischen Gesellschaft. ISBN 3-920405-41-2.
- Schumacher, G. (1886). Across the Jordan: Being an Exploration and Survey of part of Hauran and Jaulan. London: Richard Bentley and Son.
