= Ga'aton River =

River

Coordinates: 33°0′23.28″N 35°5′39.41″E

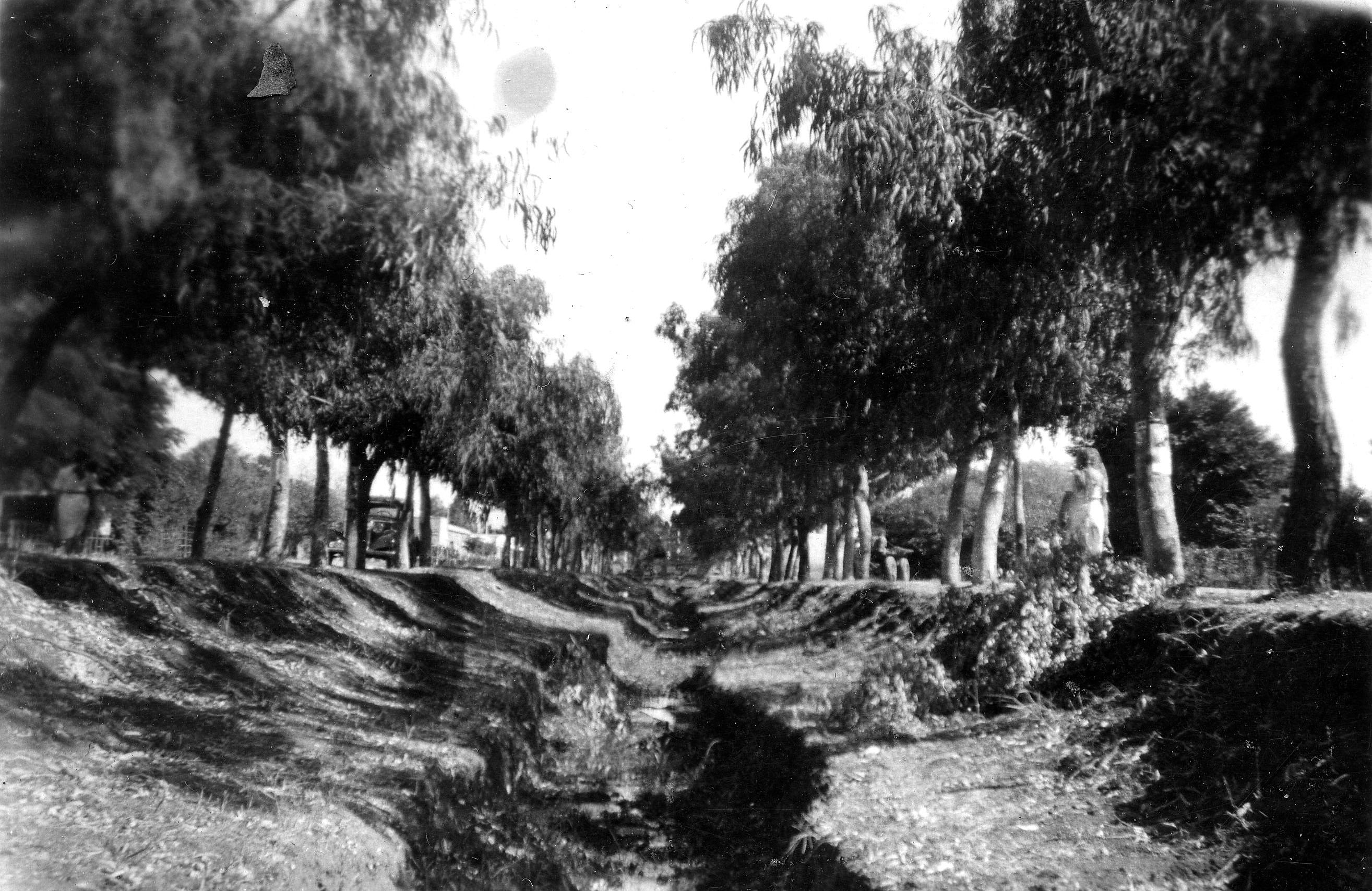
Ga'aton River (1946)

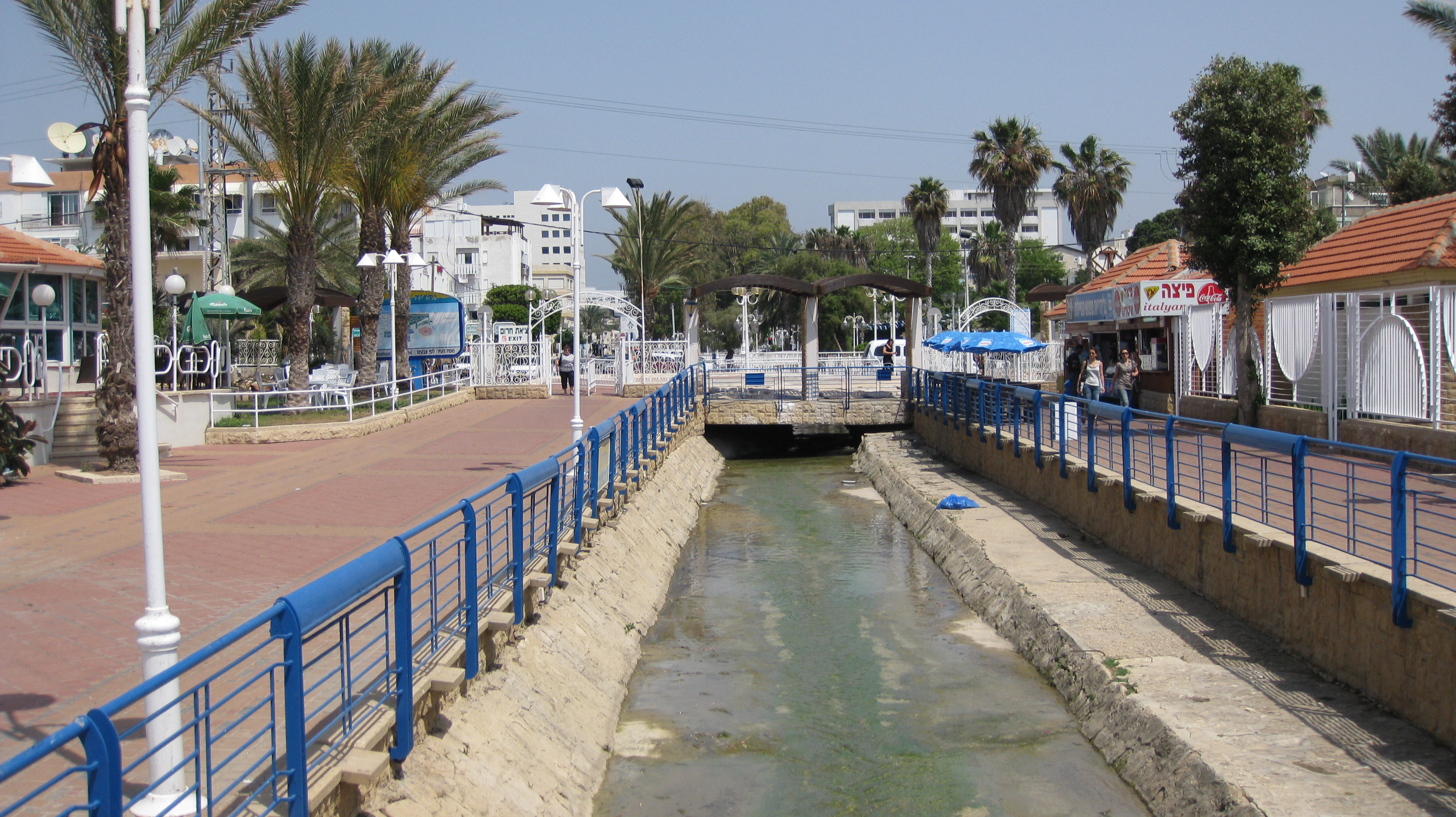

The Ga'aton Stream (Hebrew: נחל הגעתון, Nahal HaGa'aton; Arabic: وادي المفشوخ, Wadi al-Mafshukh) is a small river in the Northern District of Israel. It passes through the town of Nahariya before emptying into the Mediterranean Sea. The river runs through the main street of Nahariya, a city that takes its name from the river (nahar means river in Hebrew).

== History ==
In Ottoman times, the river was known as Nahr Mefshukh.

The source of this river, formerly known as "the fountain-head of the waters of Ǧiyāto" (Hebrew: ראש מי גיאתו), and which issued from two natural springs: ʻain a-tinah and ʻain al-ʻanqalit, is mentioned in late 2nd century rabbinic writings (Sifrei on Deuteronomy 11:24), and in the Mosaic of Rehob.

== See also ==
- Geography of Israel
- List of rivers of Israel
- Nahal Meirav
