= Yaakov Sussmann =

Israeli philologist (1931–2026)

- יעקב זוסמן
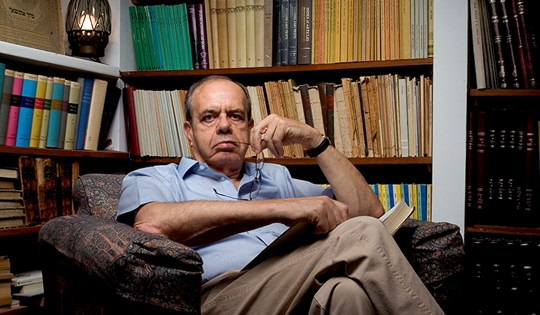
- Born: August 31, 1931; Budapest, Kingdom of Hungary
- Died: October 25, 2026 (aged 95); Jerusalem, Israel
- Education: Hebrew University of Jerusalem
- Scientific career
- Fields: Talmudic Studies
- Thesis: Babylonian Sugiyot to the Orders Zeraim and Tohorot (1969)
- Doctoral advisor: Ephraim Urbach
- Doctoral students: Vered Noam

Yaakov Sussmann (Hebrew: יעקב זוסמן; August 31, 1931 – October 25, 2026) was an Israeli philologist and scholar of the Talmud. He was a Professor Emeritus in the Department of Talmud at the Hebrew University of Jerusalem and a recipient of the Israel Prize for Talmudic Studies.

== Life and career ==
Sussmann was born in Budapest, Kingdom of Hungary on August 31, 1931. His parents were descendants of prominent rabbinical families, and his paternal grandfather served as the Chief Rabbi of Budapest. On his mother's side, he was a fifth-generation descendant of the Chatam Sofer. Following the Nazi occupation of Hungary, he and his family escaped on the Kastner train, traveling via Bergen-Belsen to Switzerland, where he continued his studies in yeshivas. In 1949, he immigrated to Israel and studied at Hebron Yeshiva.

A few years after arriving in Israel, Sussmann pursued a career in academia. After obtaining his high school diploma in 1954, he enrolled at the Hebrew University of Jerusalem, where he studied Talmud and Bible. Later, he began lecturing on Talmud and Jewish history. After completing his undergraduate and master's degrees with distinction, he earned his PhD in 1970 (under the supervision of Ephraim Urbach) with a dissertation titled "Babylonian Sugiyot to the Orders Zeraim and Tohorot". In 1975, he was appointed an Associate Professor, and in 1980, he became a Full Professor. Over the years, he served as the head of the Department of Talmud and the director of the Institute of Jewish Studies.

Sussmann's research spans a wide range of Talmudic literature, including the Babylonian Talmud, the Jerusalem Talmud, and Midrashic texts. Since 1997, he has been a member of the Academy of the Hebrew Language.

Throughout his career, Sussmann conducted extensive research in libraries across Austria, Germany, and Italy, uncovering thousands of manuscript fragments. His most significant findings include previously unknown manuscripts of the so-called "Sefer Yerushalmi" (The Jerusalemite Book), which allowed scholars to reconstruct its text and substantiate theories regarding its existence.

In 1997, he was awarded the Israel Prize for his significant contribution to Talmudic studies.

He resided in the Ramat Denya neighborhood of Jerusalem until his death. Sussmann died on October 25, 2026, at the age of 95.

== Awards and recognition ==
- 1997 – Israel Prize for Talmudic Studies
- 2006 – EMET Prize
- 2014 – Honorary Doctorate from Ben-Gurion University of the Negev

== Published works ==
=== Books ===
- Otzar Ktav Yad HaTalmudim (The Treasury of Talmudic Manuscripts), 3 volumes, co-authored with Yoav Rosenthal and Aharon Sheweka, Jerusalem: Yad Yitzhak Ben Zvi, 2012.
- Sussmann, Yaakov (2019). 'Torah SheBeAl Peh' peshuṭah ke-mashmaʻah: the power of the tip of a yod (in Hebrew). Jerusalem: Magnes Press. ISBN 978-965-7763-83-4. OCLC 1099912376.
- Genizei HaYerushalmi (The Hidden Manuscripts of the Jerusalem Talmud), co-authored with Binyamin Elitzur, Jerusalem: Yad Yitzhak Ben Zvi, 2020.
- Studies in Rabbinic Literature (Collected Articles), 2 volumes, Jerusalem: The Mandel Institute of Jewish Studies, 2026.

=== Articles ===
- Yaakov Sussmann. “The History of Halakha and the Dead Sea Scrolls — Preliminary Observations on Miqṣat Ma’ase Ha-Torah (4QMMT)" (In Hebrew) Tarbiz no. 59 (1989): 11–76. JSTOR http://www.jstor.org/stable/23598595
- Yaakov Sussmann. “The Ashkenazi Yerushalmi MS — ‘Sefer Yerushalmi’" (In Hebrew) Tarbiz no. 65(1995): 37–63. JSTOR http://www.jstor.org/stable/23599878
- Ya’akov Sussmann. “The Yerushalmi in the Literature of the Rishonim: 100 Years after ‘Ahavat Zion ViYerushalaim’" Jewish Studies 41 (2002): 17–28. JSTOR http://www.jstor.org/stable/23382803
