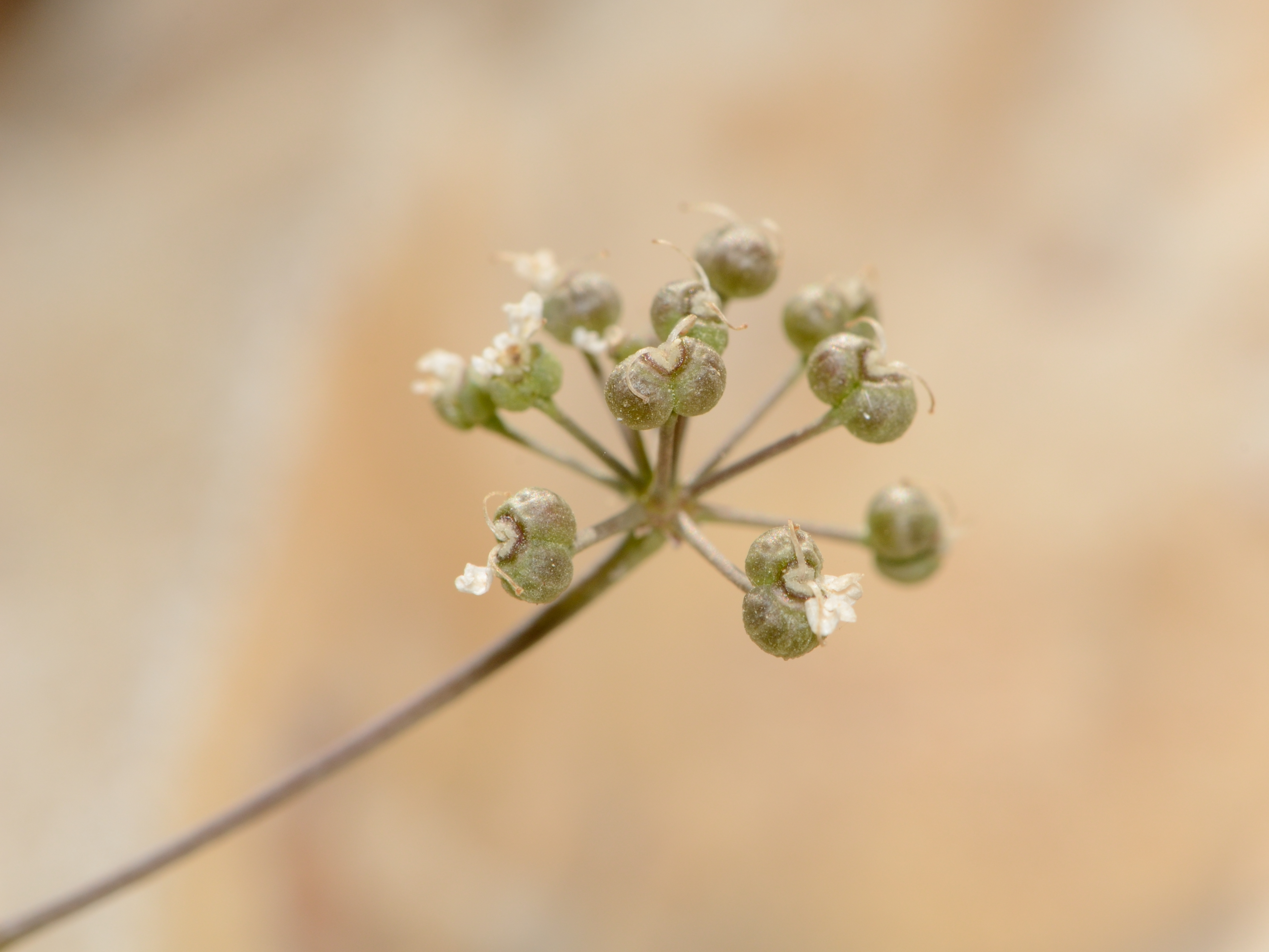
- Astomaea seselifolia

Scientific classification
- Kingdom: Plantae
- Clade: Tracheophytes
- Clade: Angiosperms
- Clade: Eudicots
- Clade: Asterids
- Order: Apiales
- Family: Apiaceae
- Subfamily: Apioideae
- Tribe: Pyramidoptereae
- Genus: Astomaea; Rchb.

Species
- Astomaea galiocarpa; Astomaea seselifolium

Synonyms
- Astoma DC.; Astomatopsis Korovin

= Astomaea =

Genus of flowering plants

Astomaea is a genus of flowering plants in the family Apiaceae. It includes two species native to western and central Asia.

Roots and bulbs of Astoma seselifolia are often collected and then roasted and eaten.

== Species ==
Two species area accepted.

- Astomaea galiocarpa (Korovin) Pimenov & Kljuykov – Tajikistan and Uzbekistan
- Astomaea seselifolia (DC.) Rauschert – eastern Mediterranean from Syria to Sinai
