= Efraim Lev =

Efraim Lev (Hebrew: אפרים לב; born 1958 in Israel) is a professor in the Department of Israel Studies and Dean of the Faculty of Humanities at the University of Haifa. He is the immediate past Head of the Centre for Interdisciplinary Research of the Cairo Genizah at the University of Haifa, and the Department of Humanities and Arts at the Technion-Israel Institute of Technology. He also headed the Eshkol Department of Multi-Disciplinary Studies for special programs and undergraduate degrees in the University of Haifa’s Faculty of Humanities (2013-2018). Lev specializes in the history of medicine and pharmacology in the Middle East, in particular from the Middle Ages and the early modern period.

== Academic career ==
Prof. Lev began his studies at Bar-Ilan University in the Department of Land of Israel Studies and the Department of Life Sciences, and in 1987 he graduated with a bachelor's degree. He later completed advanced degrees at Bar-Ilan (M.Sc. in Biology and a PhD in Land of Israel studies). He completed his postdoctoral fellowship at the Wellcome Trust Center for the History of Medicine at University College London, under the guidance of Prof. Roy Porter. Since 1999, Lev has been a lecturer at the University of Haifa. He served as a research fellow and spent long periods doing research at several institutions in Israel and abroad, such as the Taylor-Schechter Genizah Research Unit of Cambridge University Library in England. Over the course of his career, Lev has won several prestigious awards and research scholarships, including the 2003 Tel Aviv-Yafo Municipality Moshe Einhorn Prize for his book Medicinal Substances of the Medieval Levant and the Overseas Visiting Scholarship from St. John's College at the University of Cambridge. In 2012, he won the prestigious George Urdang Medal for pharmaco-historical writing. In 2017, he was awarded a medal and membership from the International Academy of the History of Pharmacy.

== Selected projects ==
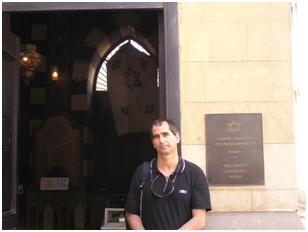
Prof. Efraim Lev in front of the Ben Ezra Synagogue in Cairo, Egypt where the Genizah fragments were found

Lev's research first focused on archaeobotany. As part of this area of study, he researched the dietary remains of Neanderthal man in Kebara Cave on Mount Carmel dating back nearly 47,000-60,000 years ago. The variety of plant species discovered indicates the human vegetal diet of the period, which included primarily the eating of various types of legumes. In his later research, Lev specialized in the history of medicine and pharmacology in the Middle Ages and the early modern period. Lev’s dual expertise in history and biology has allowed him to explore topics that are rarely researched together.

=== Past projects ===
1. An early study of Lev’s in 1993 conducted an archaeological reconstruction of human dietary and medicinal uses of natural plant resources in the Paleolithic Middle East.
2. Another study of his focused on natural curative substances used by the inhabitants of the Levant from the time of the Muslim conquest to the age of Napoleon.
3. Ethno-pharmacology and ethnobotany are other areas in which Lev has focused. His research in the regions of Israel and Jordan in particular, examines the structure, use, and survival of theoretical and practical knowledge of traditional medicine from prehistoric times until the present day. As part of his research in this area, Lev worked with Professor Zohar Amar from the Department of Land of Israel Studies and Archaeology at Bar-Ilan University documenting medicinal substances in the various markets in Israel and Jordan.
4. Another historical study conducted by Lev in collaboration with Dr. Yaron Perry from the University of Haifa’s Department of Israel Studies examined the introduction of modern Western medicine to the Land of Israel in general, and to the Jewish population in Jerusalem in the 19th century in particular. This study examined the activities of British missionary physicians who came on expeditions to the Holy Land to promote the health of local Jews and by doing so, influenced the development of modern medicine. This work focused mainly on modern medical techniques and pharmaceuticals brought from England and the rest of Europe and the process by which the pioneering new methods replaced popular ones that were based on traditional medicine. As part of this study, the biographies of several prominent British physicians from this period were reconstructed.
5. Around 2010, Lev began focusing on the study of various aspects of medieval Arab medicine based on a historic find discovered in the Cairo Genizah. The Genizah documents he studied (medical prescriptions, lists of medicinal substances, letters, medical notebooks, and parts of medical texts) shed light on the population in the Mediterranean Basin in general and in Egypt in particular, especially between the 10-13th centuries. Those documents describe medical information and practical pharmacology of that time, and allow a comparison with the theoretical knowledge we have from the physicians of that period.
6. Lev established the Centre for Interdisciplinary Research of the Cairo Genizah at the University of Haifa, in collaboration with Dr. Moshe Lavee and served as its Director until recently. The Centre organizes lectures and exhibitions in Israel and around the world to publicize findings of Genizah study from recent decades and encourage multidisciplinary research. As part of the project, biographies of Jewish physicians and healers who worked in Islamic lands are being reconstructed with the aim of expanding knowledge about the medical and socio-economic systems that existed during the Genizah period.
7. At the beginning of 2010, Lev also participated in a study associated with the Agricultural Research Organization - Volcani Center in Israel, focusing on medicinal herbs and agricultural crops. As part of this research, he primarily reviewed historical sources to better understand traditional uses of relevant vegetation in the Middle East.
8. Another research project by Lev together with Amar investigated the impact of the medicinal substances that the Arabs introduced to the Middle East and Europe during the Middle Ages. Much of this trade was carried out by Jewish merchants at trading posts in India, Yemen, Egypt, Sicily, Syria, and even the North African countries that constitute the Maghreb region.
9. In parallel with some of the above mentioned projects, Lev has taken part in research efforts in alternative supplemental medicine. In this area, he joined several research groups focusing on the use of medicinal herbs by various ethnic groups from ancient times until present day. Lev’s focus in these studies has been on the effect of medicinal plants on cancer patients in Israel during chemotherapy. This project has resulted in the publication of several articles in collaboration with researchers from different countries.

== Prominent scientific publications ==
=== Ph.D thesis ===
Medical Materials and Their Use During the Medieval Era in Israel and Syria, 1998, (365 pages), Hebrew, Department of Land of Israel Studies, Bar-Ilan University. Supervisors: Dr. Joseph Drori and Prof. Eran Dolev.

=== Books ===
- E. Lev and M.E. Kislev, The Subsistence and the Diet of the “Neanderthal” Man in Kebara Cave, Mt. Carmel, Tel Aviv: The Israeli Society for Protection of Nature and Yad Hanadiv. 1993. Hebrew. (63 pages).
- Z. Amar and E. Lev, Physicians, Drugs and Remedies in Jerusalem from the 10th-18th Centuries. Tel Aviv: Eretz publication, 2000. Hebrew. (320 pages).
- E. Lev, Medicinal Substances of the Medieval Levant. Tel Aviv: Eretz publication, 2002. Hebrew. (380 pages).
- E. Lev and Z. Amar, Ethnic Medicinal Substances of the Land of Israel. Tel Aviv: Eretz and Jerusalem: Yerid-Hasefarim. 2002, Hebrew, (330 pages).
- E. Lev, Medicinal Substances in Jerusalem from Early Times to Present Day. Oxford: Archeopress, 2003 (BAR International Series 1112). (150 pages).
- Y. Perry and E. Lev, Modern Medicine in the Holy Land, Pioneering British Medical Services in Late Ottoman Palestine. London: I.B. Tauris, (2007) (260 pages).
- E. Lev and Z. Amar, Practical Materia Medica of the Medieval Eastern Mediterranean According to the Cairo Genizah. Leiden: Brill (2008) (670 pages).
- E. Lev and L. Chipman, Medical Prescriptions in the Cambridge Genizah Collections: Practical Medicine and Pharmacology in Medieval Egypt, Leiden: Brill (2012) (187 A4 pages).
- Z. Amar and E. Lev, Arabian Drugs in Early Medieval Mediterranean Medicine. Edinburgh: Edinburgh University Press (2016) (290 pages).
- E. Lev, Jewish Medical Practitioners in Medieval Muslim Territories: A Collective Biography, Edinburgh: Edinburgh University Press (2021) (528 pages).

=== Selected scientific articles ===
- E. Lev and Z. Amar, "Ethnopharmacological Survey of Traditional Drugs Sold in Israel at the End of the 20th Century", Journal of Ethnopharmacology, (2000) 72:191-205.
- E. Lev, "Reconstructed materia medica of the Medieval and Ottoman al-Sham”, Journal of Ethnopharmacology (2002) 80:167-179.
- Y. Perry and E. Lev, “The Medical Activities of the London Jews' Society in Nineteenth Century Palestine”, Medical History, (2003) 47:67-88.
- E. Lev, “Traditional Healing with Animals (Zootherapy): Medieval to Present-day Levantine Practice”, Journal of Ethnopharmacology (2003) 85:107-118.
- E. Lev, M.E. Kislev and O. Bar-Yosef, “Mousterian Vegetal Food in Kebara Cave, Mt. Carmel”, Journal of Archeological Sciences (2005) 32:475-484.
- E. Lev, "Drugs Held and Sold by Pharmacists of the Jewish Community of Medieval (11th -14th centuries) Cairo According to Lists of Materia Medica Found at the Taylor-Schechter Genizah Collection, Cambridge", Journal of Ethnopharmacology (2007), 110:275-293.
- E. Lev and Z. Amar, "Practice Versus Theory: Medieval Materia Medica According to the Cairo Genizah", Medical History (2007) 51:507-526.
- Z. Amar and E. Lev, "The Significance of the Genizah's Medical Documents for the Study of Medieval Mediterranean Trade", Journal of the Economic and Social History of the Orient, (2007) 50:524-541.
- E. Lev, "Medieval Egyptian Judaeo-Arabic Prescriptions (and Edition of Three Medical Prescriptions)", Journal of Royal Asiatic Society (2008) 18(4): 449-464.
- E. Lev, "Healing with Minerals and Inorganic Substances: A Review of Levantine Practice from the Middle Ages to the Present Day", International Geological Reviews (2010), 52:700-725.
- E. Lev, "A Catalogue of the Medical and Para-Medical Manuscripts in the Mosseri Genizah Collection, together with several unpublished examples (X.37; I.124.2)", Journal of Jewish Studies (2011), 62:121-145.
- E. Lev, “Mediators between Theoretical and Practical Medieval Knowledge: Medical Notebooks from the Cairo Genizah and their Significance” Medical History (2013) 57(4): 487-515.
- E. Lev, “Legacies and Prospects in Geniza Studies and the History of Medicine: Reconstruction of the Medical Bookshelf of Medieval (Jewish) Practitioners”, Jewish History (2019), 32, 559-562.
- A. Mazor, E. Lev, “Dynasties of Jewish Physicians in the Fatimid and Ayyubid Periods”, Hebrew Union College Annual (2019), 89: 225-265.
- G. Gambash, G. Bar-Oz, E. Lev, and U. Jeremais, “Bygone Fish: Rediscovering the Red-Sea as a Delicacy of Byzantine Negev Cuisine”, Near Easter Archeology (2019), 82(4): 216-225.
