= Zohar Amar =

Israeli academic

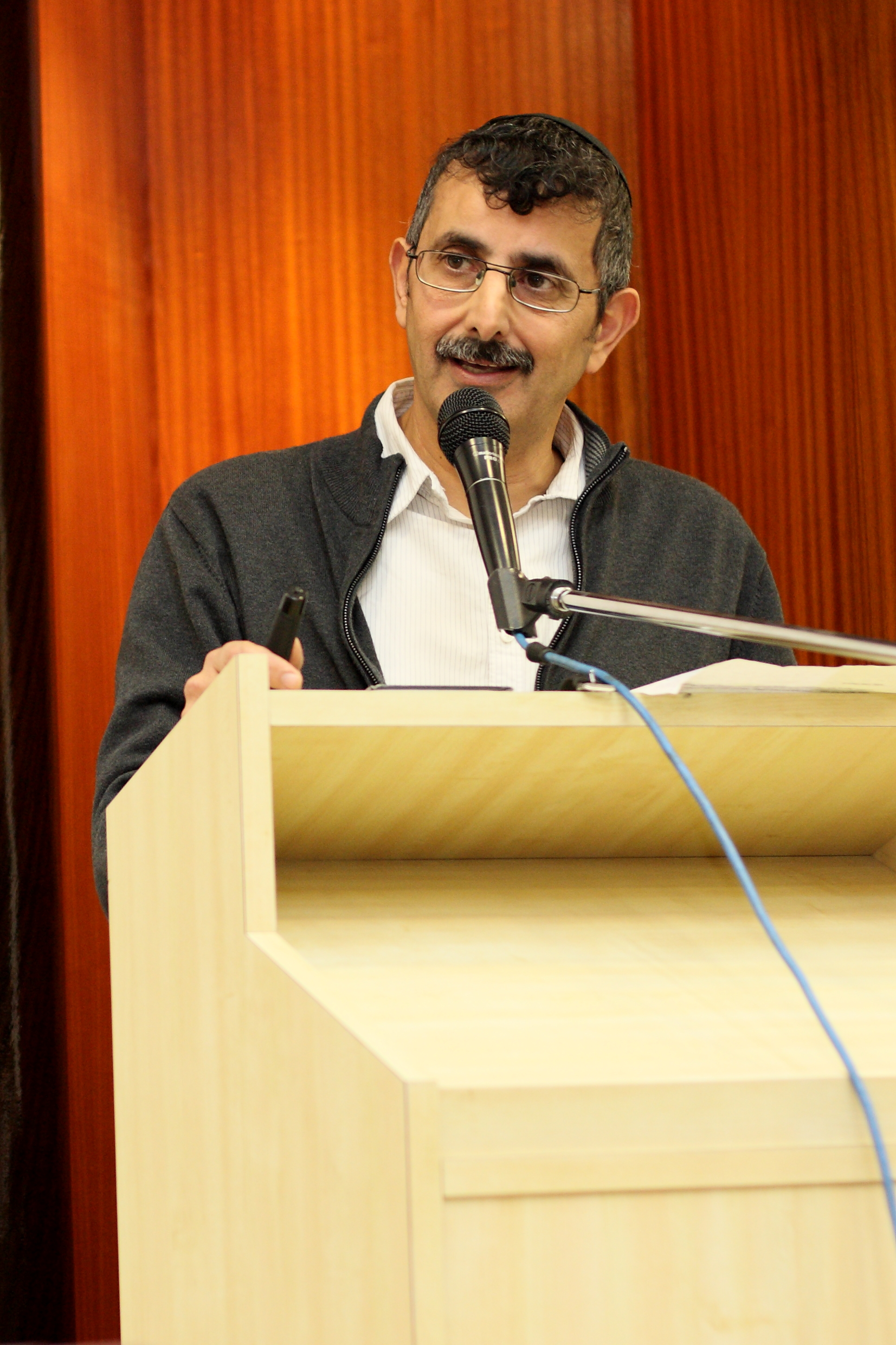
Zohar Amar

Zohar Amar (Hebrew: זוהר עמר; born 1960) is a professor in the Department of Land of Israel Studies at the Bar-Ilan University, whose research specialties are: natural history in ancient times; the identification of the flora of the Land of Israel and identification of the fauna of the Land of Israel according to descriptions in classical Jewish sources; the material culture and realia of daily life in the Middle Ages as reflected in agriculture and commerce; the history of medicine and ethno-pharmacology. His research integrates diverse fields of knowledge, including branches of natural science, history, archaeology, linguistics, and Judaic studies.

Notable research in recent years: Documents from the Cairo Genizah as a source of information about medicine in the Middle East in medieval times; pigments in ancient textiles; the early papermaking industry; kermes oak coccid as the source of the Biblical scarlet dye; purple dye; the balsam plant; traditional medicinal drugs in the land of Israel; documentation of traditions regarding the kashrut of various animals.

== Biography ==
Zohar Amar, born in 1960, lives in Israel, married and the father of six children. He attended a yeshiva high school and Yeshivat Mercaz HaRav Kook in Jerusalem. In his youth he worked as a tour guide and in the Society for the Protection of Nature in Israel. Between 1985 -1990 he was the director of the Ecological Botanical Garden at Abu Kabir on the old Tel Aviv University campus. He completed his studies for the BA, Ma, and PhD degrees at Bar-Ilan University. His doctoral dissertation was entitled: “Agricultural Production in the Land of Israel during the Middle Ages; Description and Changes”, under the supervision of Prof. Yehuda Feliks and Prof. Yosef Drory. He is presently an associate professor at Bar-Ilan University and served as head of the Department of Land of Israel Studies and Archaeology in 2004-5 and 2009.

== Research methods ==
Zohar Amar has been involved in various areas of research that link Torah and science, presenting a new examination of the classical Jewish sources and offering a different perspective on conventional thinking. His approach is to harness contemporary research techniques to scholarship in Jewish Studies. In his research he tries to apply almost every available piece of information, making extensive use of Hebrew literature and Arabic literature and the early, classical sources including ancient Greek, Latin, and Syriac literature. Special emphasis is placed on Jewish and Moslem sources which were written in Arabic in the Middle Ages, presenting their contribution to an understanding of the cultural and material flowering in the Islamic world. Many studies were devoted to understanding the realia embedded in the treatises written by R. Saadia Gaon and Maimonides.

Another of area of his research is related to an identification of the flora and fauna mentioned in the Scriptures and the rabbinical writings. In his recent works, Amar proposes a critical reappraisal of present identifications and a re-classification by levels of probability (i.e.: certain, doubtful). His approach gives the tradition of identification the highest rating of all measures that exist today in this field of scholarship. He also published, in collaboration with other scholars, a new proposal for identifying the ‘clean’ animals in the Torah in light of the archaeo-zoological findings uncovered in the Land of Israel and its environs. A considerable part of his work is devoted to the study of the plant life and agriculture mentioned in the Scriptures, Mishnah, and Talmud, which includes actually cultivating crops and reconstructing the manufacture of the products derived from them. Among others he has replicated the production of milkweed fabric, deciphered the inscription of "Šmn Rahus" mentioned on Samarian ostraca, proposed a recreation of the Temple showbread, initiated the restoration of the balsam plant to Israel, discovered the scarlet dye of the Torah (the Kermes oak coccid) and produced dye from it, replicated the purple dye [argaman], made an identification of dyes in ancient textiles and a historical and laboratory identification of the raw materials used in papermaking in the Middle Ages in light of scientific testing of documents from the Cairo Genizah.

== History of medicine in the ancient world ==
A study of the history of medicine in the ancient world has become one of the most important fields of research in historical scholarship. Amar established, in collaboration with Professor Efraim Lev (of the University of Haifa), the “Unit on the History of Medicine in the Land of Israel”, one of the most important centers of academic research in Israel operating in this field. Research focuses on documenting the medical tradition from the ancient world until the present, especially Materia Medica, the spices used in the Temple incense and perfume, and it included a comprehensive ethnopharmacological survey conducted in marketplaces that specialize in selling traditional medicinal spices and herbs in Israel, Jordan, and Morocco. Recently he completed a comprehensive survey of Materia Medica used by the Ethiopian community in Israel (in collaboration with Dikla Danino). Another prominent study dealt with practical medicine in the Middle Ages in the Middle East according to medical prescriptions found in the Cairo Genizah.

Zohar Amar has published in collaboration with colleagues several ancient medical manuscripts, such as the treatise of the Jerusalem physician a-Tamimi (10th century), the Sori ha-Guf by R. Nathan ben Yoel Falaquera (13th century), Practical Medicine of Rabbi Hayyim Vital (16th century), and P’ri Megaddim by Rabbi David de Silva, Physician of Jerusalem (18th century).

== The kashrut of animals ==
Zohar Amar initiated a project which documents the kashrut traditions for various animals in Jewish communities around the world. The result was the publication of two books: The Locust in Jewish Tradition and The Tradition of Fowl in Jewish Halacha, as well as dozens of articles on the subject of kashrut which won recognition by religious authorities. In the course of his research, he managed to record ancient traditions from elderly referents. One of the direct products of this endeavor was the granting of official rabbinical sanction to the raising of buffalo (jamus) for meat in Israel. The historical Torah-based research was conducted in collaboration with Dr. Ari Zivotofsky, and it was he who demonstrated that Jewish Studies can constitute a field for applied research. In one study in which Zohar Amar participated, it was proven that the curdling of milk in mammals is a reliable parameter to distinguish between Biblically-determined ritually clean and unclean animals. Among the clean animals whose milk was tested and curdled were: the ibex, red deer and giraffe.

== Selected publications ==
- Legends and Tales of Plants in the Botanical-Ecological Park, published by the Society for the Protection of Nature, Tel-Aviv 1987.
- Foodstuffs and Industrial Products Grown in the Land of Israel during the Middle Ages, Jerusalem 1996.
- A Historical Survey of Medicinal Substances in the al-Sham Region during the Middle Ages (640-1517 CE), Tel-Aviv 1999 (with E. Lev).
- Agricultural Products in the Land of Israel in the Middle Ages, Jerusalem 2000.
- Physicians, Drug, and Remedies in Jerusalem from the 10th-18th Centuries, Tel-Aviv 2000 (with E. Lev).
- Maimonides' Regimen Sanitiatis: Commentary of R. Jacob Zahalon on Hilchot Deot – Chapter Four, Neve-Tzuf 2001.
- The Book of Incense, Tel-Aviv 2002.
- Ethnic Medicinal Substances of the Land of Israel, Jerusalem 2002 (with E. Lev).
- The History of Medicine in Jerusalem, Archaeopress, Oxford 2002. (English)
- Bamme Madlikin, Tel-Aviv 2003 (with A. Shwiky).
- P'ri Megaddim by Rabbi David de Silva, Physician of Jerusalem, Jerusalem 2003.
- The Tradition of Fowl in Jewish Halacha, Tel Aviv 2004.
- The Land of Israel and Syria as Described by al-Tamimi: Jerusalem Physician of the 10th Century, Ramat-Gan 2004 (with Y. Serri).
- The Locust in Jewish Tradition, Ramat-Gan 2004.
- Sori ha-Guf by R. Nathan ben Yoel Falaquera (Edited & Commented with Y. Buchman, Tel- Aviv 2004.
- Rabbi Yosef Kafih's Notebook on the Plants of the Mishna, Tel Aviv 2005.
- Practical Medicine of Rabbi Hayyim Vital (1543–1620), Jerusalem 2006 (with Y. Buchman).
- Tracking the Scarlet Dye of the Holy Land, Jerusalem 2007.
- Practical Materia Medica of the Medieval Eastern Mediterranean According to the Cairo Genizah (With Efraim Lev), Brill & Sir Henry Wellcome Series, 7, Leiden 2008 (677 pp.)
- Merorim – Bitter Herbs, Tel Aviv 2008.
- The Four Species Anthology, Tel Aviv 2009
- Etrogim of the Land of Israel: A modern study of their roots, Tel Aviv 2010.
- Five Types of Grain: Historical and Conceptual Aspects, Yeshiva Har Bracha 2011.
- Flora of the Bible, Jerusalem 2012.
- The Argaman (Purple), Porphura and Arjawan in Jewish sources and further inquiries into Tekhelet, Yeshiva Har Bracha 2014.
- Flora and Fauna in Maimonides's Teachings, [Machon Hatorah Veharetz] 2015.
- Shmona Shratzim, [Machon Moshe] 2016.
- Assaf's book of medicines : treatise on the properties of foodstuffs, Kiryat Ono 2022.
- Arabian Drugs in Early Medieval Mediterranean Medicine, Edinburgh University Press, 2017 (with E. Lev).
- Differing Halachic Customs between "Baladi" Yemenite and Other Jewish Communities, Neve Tzuf 2017.
- The Beauty of gemstone: the Hoshen jewels and precious stones in the ancient world, Har Berach 2017.

== From the press ==
- haaretz.com
- http://www1.biu.ac.il/indexE.php?id=33&pt=20&pid=4&level=1&cPath=4&type=1&news=111
- https://web.archive.org/web/20110527124610/http://www.jewishtribune.ca/tribune/PDF/jt090910.pdf
- Kosher 'pork of the sea' makes aliya from Iran

JUDY SIEGEL; Jerusalem Post; Aug 19, 2005; pg. 06;

- Democratic choices, Jerusalem Post; Jan 10, 2003; pg. 03; (on the scarlet dye)
- Sacred spices, YEHOSHUA SISKIN; Jerusalem Post; Dec 16, 2005; pg. 39;
- The scent of holiness

Yehoshua Siskin; Jerusalem Post; Mar 26, 2004; pg. 45; (on the balsam)

- "Do you take your locusts with ketchup or mayonnaise?". Jerusalem Post. November 23, 2004. Archived from the original on March 4, 2016 – via HighBeam Research.

ABIGAIL RADOSZKOWICZ; Jerusalem Post; Nov 23, 2004; pg. 01;

- Buffalo meat is kosher, Chief Rabbi Amar rules

MATTHEW WAGNER; Jerusalem Post; May 10, 2006; pg. 02;

- http://www.jweekly.com/article/full/19058/scholar-finds-ancient-scarlet-dye/
- https://www.telegraph.co.uk/news/worldnews/middleeast/israel/2084281/Giraffe-is-kosher-Israeli-vets-have-ruled.html
- http://www.forward.com/articles/129694/
- https://www.jpost.com/LocalIsrael/InJerusalem/Article.aspx?id=11338 (history of medicine)
