= Yevgeny Petrovich Korovin =

Yevgeny (Yevgeni, Evgenii, Eugeny) Petrovich Korovin (Евгений Петрович Коровин; 13 (25) February 1891, Moscow – 1 December 1963, Moscow) was a prominent Soviet botanist known for his extensive contributions to the study of Central Asian flora and vegetation. The plant species named after Korovin may be identified by the Latin epithet korovinii (or korowinii).

Korovin graduated from Moscow University in 1917 and began his career in Tashkent in 1920, where he helped establish Turkestan University. In 1932, he became a professor at the university, heading the department of higher plants and plant geography.

From 1943 to 1948, Korovin served as the director of the Institute of Botany and Zoology of the Academy of Sciences of the Uzbek SSR, and later, from 1950 to 1952, he directed the Institute of Botany of the same academy. In 1947, he was elected an academician of the Academy of Sciences of the Uzbek SSR.

Korovin's research focused on the flora of Central Asia, where he described over 100 new plant species and 8 new genera, primarily within the Apiaceae, Amaranthaceae, and Polygonaceae families. He also created a geobotanical map and conducted regionalization of Central Asian vegetation. Additionally, he explored issues related to the agricultural development of arid territories.

Korovin was a two-time recipient of the Komarov Prize of the Soviet Academy of Sciences, first in 1947 for his Illustrated Monograph of the Genus Ferula and again in 1963 for his two-volume study Vegetation of Central Asia and Southern Kazakhstan. He was honored with the Order of Lenin for his contributions to science.

The standard author abbreviation Korovin is used to indicate this person as the author when citing a botanical name.
