= Tarbiz =

Academic journal on Jewish studies

Tarbiẕ
- Discipline: Jewish studies
- Language: Hebrew
- Edited by: Roni Goldstein, Moshe Halbertal, Shlomo Neah, Sarit Shalu-Aini

Publication details
- History: 1930–present
- Publisher: Mandel Institute for Jewish Studies (Magnes Publishing House, Hebrew University) (Israel)
- Frequency: Quarterly

Standard abbreviations
- ISO 4: Tarbiz

Indexing
- ISSN: 0334-3650
- LCCN: sn85006921
- JSTOR: 03343650
- OCLC no.: 1026583582

Links
- Journal homepage

Tarbiẕ (Hebrew: תרביץ, romanized: tarbiṣ) is a quarterly academic journal of contemporary Jewish studies, humanities and religion (including Judaism, Biblical criticism, Talmud, Kabbalah, Jewish customs, and Jewish history). It is published in Hebrew by the Institute of Jewish Studies (now "Mandel Institute for Jewish Studies", Hebrew University of Jerusalem). The journal was established in 1930. Etymologically, the word "Tarbiz" means "place of dissemination of learning," particularly that related to an "academy," or "seat of learning." The editors-in-chief are Jonathan Garb and Michael Segal.

== History ==
The first editor of the journal was Yaakov Nahum Epstein who served until 1952, after whom Hayyim Schirmann took-over until 1969. He was followed by Ephraim Elimelech Urbach (1970–1981), while assisted by E.J. Goleh. The following years saw a range of other chief editors.

The current publisher is the Magnes Publishing House at the Hebrew University.

== Abstracting and indexing ==
The journal is abstracted and indexed in EBSCO databases, the International Bibliography of Periodical Literature, Linguistic Bibliography, Old Testament Abstracts, and the Modern Language Association Database.
