= Yitzchok Isaac Krasilschikov =

Jewish rabbi and Talmudic scholar

Rav Yitzchok Isaac Krasilschikov
- יצחק אייזיק קרסילשציקוב יצחק אייזיק קראסילשציקאוו
- Title: Gaon of Poltava

Personal life
- Born: Yitzchok Isaac ben Dov Ber Krasilschikov; 1888 Kritchev, Russian Empire (now Belarus)
- Died: 13 May 1965 (aged 76–77) Moscow, Russian SFSR, Soviet Union (now Russia)

Religious life
- Religion: Judaism
- Denomination: Orthodox (Haredi)

Jewish leader
- Yeshiva: Mir Yeshiva
- Main work: Talmudic commentaries

Yitzchok Isaac ben Dov Ber Krasilschikov (Hebrew: יצחק אייזיק קרסילשציקוב; Yiddish: יצחק אייזיק קראסילשציקאוו, romanized: Itzchok Eyzik Krasilshtzikov; 1888 – 13 May 1965), also known as the "Gaon of Poltava," was a Talmudic scholar and author of a monumental commentary on the Jerusalem Talmud. He was one of the last publicly practicing Orthodox rabbis in the Soviet Union.

== Early years ==
Born in 1888 in the small Belarusian town of Kritchev to Rabbi Dov Ber Krasilschikov, he studied in the Mir Yeshiva under Rabbi Eliyahu Baruch Kamai, who was his primary teacher and mentor. Before the Russian Revolution, Krasilschikov was the Rabbi of Heditz, then of Poltava, from which he was known as the 'Gaon of Poltava' and where in 1926 he printed Tevunah, the first volume of his commentary on the Rambam, which he had written when he was 23 years old. This was the last Jewish religious work published in communist Russia. During World War II he avoided being murdered by the Nazis in the Holocaust by residing in Siberia. The second volume of the commentary remained in manuscript until it was smuggled out of Russia and published by Bronstein in 1976.

When communist authorities increased their persecution of Jewish scholars, primarily targeting prominent Russian rabbis, Krasilschikov left the rabbinate and settled in Moscow where he took a job as an accountant. He lived with his wife in a small apartment near the Kremlin, where, after working for the government during the day, he returned home to study Torah at night.

== Talmudic commentaries ==
Krasilschikov authored a 20-volume dual-commentary on the Talmud Yerushalmi in Moscow between the years 1952-1965. However, this was done in secrecy, due to fear of and oppression by the Communist regime, which had outlawed the study of Torah. Violators of this ban were subject to severe punishment and exile to Siberia. The work of Rabbi Krasilschikov was done without the benefit of any formal academy, and with very few reference works. It is reported that he did not even have a complete set of Talmud Bavli.

=== Deathbed confession ===
On 12 May 1965, Rabbi Yehudah Leib Levin, the chief rabbi of Moscow, asked the visiting American Rabbi Harry (Tzvi) Bronstein of the Al Tidom Association to accompany him to visit Krasilschikov, who was lying gravely ill in hospital. At the hospital, Krasilschikov confided to Bronstein that beneath his cushion was the second volume of his manuscript, Tevunah on the Rambam, which he asked Bronstein to publish. However, Krasilschikov cautioned Bronstein to be very careful when removing the manuscript, as Krasilschikov feared that some of the nurses were secret agents of the KGB. Bronstein responded that although he could not guarantee success in smuggling the manuscript out from behind the Iron Curtain, if he did manage he would commit to publishing it. In 1976, Bronstein was able to keep his word and printed the second volume of Tevunah, fifty years after the first volume had been published in Poltava.

During the same meeting Krasilschikov also confided that he had written a dual commentary that would make the study of the Jerusalem Talmud far easier for those who wished to learn it. The twenty volumes containing some twenty thousand pages were, at the time, hidden in his daughters houses. On the following day, 13 May 1965, Rabbi Krasilschikov died.

=== Saga of escape ===
True to his word, Bronstein tried to smuggle Krasilschikov's Talmudic works out of the country. During his first attempt, all twenty volumes were microfilmed and brought to the American embassy in Moscow, from where they were to be taken out of the country via diplomatic pouch. However, on the night before they were to be flown out, a fire broke out on the eighth floor of the American embassy and the microfilm was destroyed.

After making many more unsuccessful attempts, Bronstein was arrested on 5 June 1967 at the airport in Kiev, declared persona non grata, deported from the country, and forbidden to enter any Soviet-controlled state ever again. However, he continued his efforts to smuggle the manuscripts out through intermediaries.

Finally, on the 17th attempt, the first of the twenty volumes was successfully smuggled out of Russia by Yaakov Pollack, the rabbi of Congregation Shomrei Emunah of Borough Park in Brooklyn, New York. After that event, with the help of friendly consular representatives Rabbi Bronstein was successful in removing the entire manuscript and bringing it to a safe place.

=== Publication ===
In 1980, the Mutzal Me'esh Institute of Bnei Brak, under Bronstein's auspices, published the first volume of Krasilschikov’s commentary, on Tractate Berachot. This volume, as well as the following one, were edited by a team of scholars and include the text of the Jerusalem Talmud surrounded by the dual commentaries of Krasilschikov, titled Toldos Yitzchak and Tevunah. The Toldos Yitzchak commentary is a clear and lucid explanation of the Yerushalmi, while Tevunah is a more detailed discussion of issues in the Yerushalmi that also contains emendations to its text.

The printing of the Jerusalem Talmud with his commentaries was completed in 2012 with the completion of Tractate Rosh Hashanah. The following tractates were published:

- Berachot, two volumes (1980)
- Sheviit (1982)
- Pe'ah (1985)
- Demai (1988)
- Kil'ayim (1989)
- Terumot (1987)
- Maaserot (1991)
- Hallah (1991)
- Ma'aser Sheni (1991)
- Orlah (1995)
- Bikkurim (1995)
- Shabbat (1990)
- Eruvin (2007)
- Pesachim (2008)
- Shekalim (2009)
- Yoma (2009)
- Sukkah and Rosh Hashanah (2012)
