= Kil'ayim (tractate) =

Jewish law forbidding some types of mixing

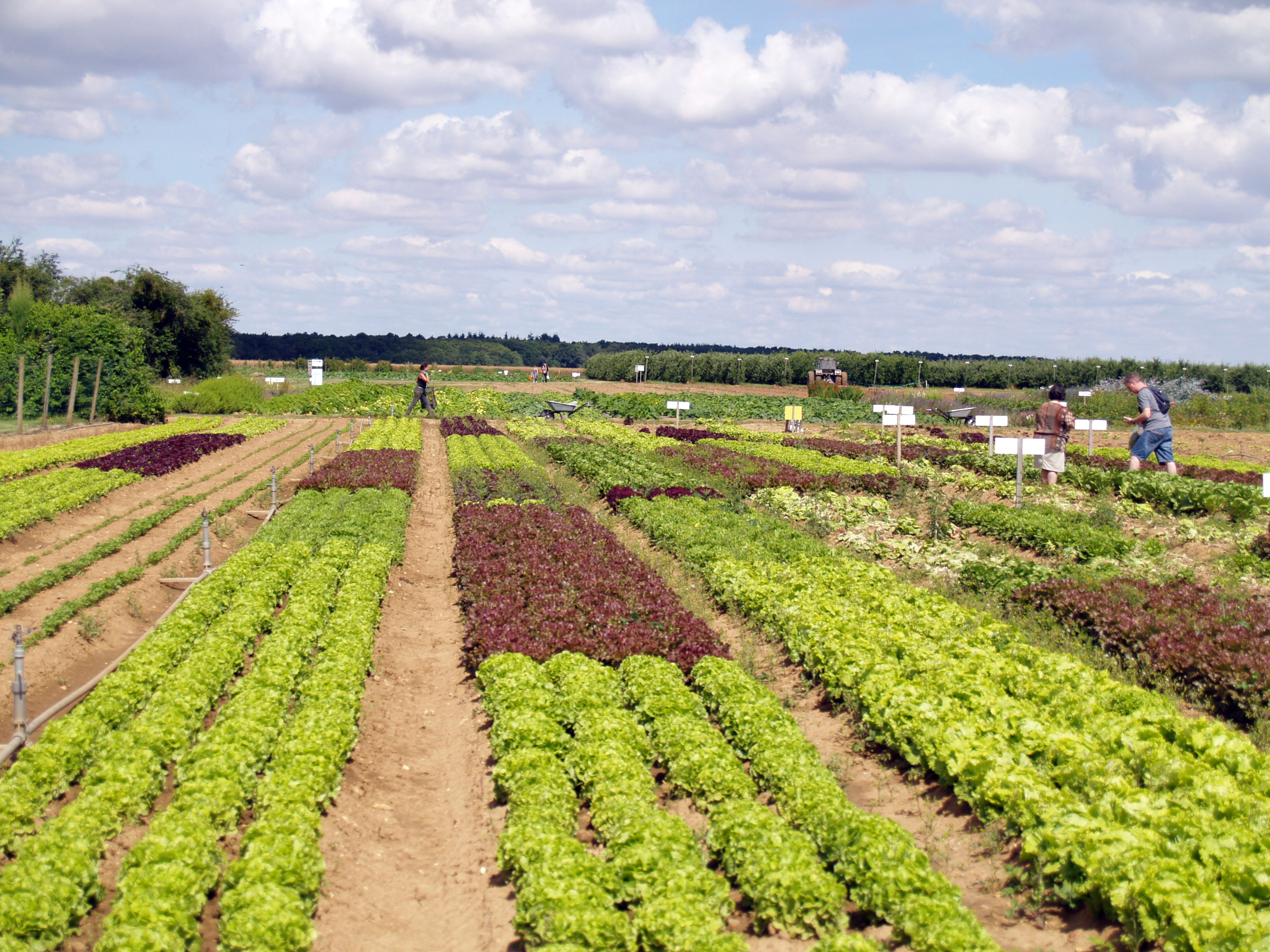
- Field with distinct plots for different species

Tractate of the Talmud
- English: Prohibited mixtures
- Seder: Zeraim
- Number of mishnahs: 77
- Chapters: 9
- Babylonian Talmud pages: -
- Jerusalem Talmud pages: 44
- Tosefta chapters: 5

Kil'ayim (Hebrew: כִּלְאַיִם, lit. "Mixed Kinds") is the fourth tractate of Seder Zeraim ("Order of Seeds") of the Mishnah, dealing with several biblical prohibitions of mixed species, namely, planting certain mixtures of seeds, grafting different species of trees together, growing plants other than grapevines in vineyards, crossbreeding animals, working a team of different kinds of animals together, and mixing wool and linen in garments.

The prohibitions are derived from the Torah in Leviticus 19:19 and Deuteronomy 22:9–11.

Like most tractates in the order of Zeraim, it appears in the Mishnah, the Jerusalem Talmud and the Tosefta only; there is no Babylonian Talmud for this tractate.

== Subject matter ==
This tractate concerns the laws regarding various types of mixtures of agricultural products that are forbidden according to the Torah, in accordance with Leviticus 19:9 and Deuteronomy 22:9–11. Specifically, the Mishnah deals with the exact definition of the following categories of prohibitions:

- planting different kinds of seeds together
- grafting trees of different types
- planting grain, vegetables or herbs in a vineyard
- cross-breeding different species of animals
- ploughing or doing other work with two different kinds of animal teamed together
- mixing wool and linen threads in garments

The types of seeds determined to be included within this category are the five species of grain of the Land of Israel, (wheat, barley, oats, rye and spelt), legumes, and greens whose roots or stalks are consumed by humans. Since the vineyard is particularly specified in the Deuteronomy passage, it is treated specifically. The prohibitions concern domestic animals; wild animals and birds are not mentioned in this tractate, but the Mishnah in Bava Kamma (5, 7) notes these cases.

The laws are derived from a relatively straightforward reading of the Torah, and the details discussed in the tractate are deduced through logic, analogies with other areas of law, or by application of the general rules to specific objects and situations.

Because the prohibitions only apply to the mixing of distinct species, but not to variants of a single species, the tractate contends with the botanical or biological classifications of seeds, trees or animals, from the standpoint of establishing which are or are not separate species.

Since the prohibition in the vineyard is spelled out in the Torah, along with an explicit warning “lest the fruit of your seed which you have sown, and the fruit of your vineyard, be defiled,” it is treated more stringently, and the produce of such a mixture does not become permitted after the fact, as would occur in the case of mixed seeds.

The Jerusalem Talmud, in addition to its commentary on the laws cited in the Mishnah and Tosefta, contains Aggadah, with biographical stories about Rabbi Judah ha-Nasi (135 – 217 CE) and his contemporaries, another version of which also appears in the Babylonian Talmud (tractate Bava Metzia 83b).

== Structure ==
The tractate comprises nine chapters and 77 paragraphs (mishnayot). It has a Gemara – rabbinical analysis of and commentary on the Mishnah – in the Jerusalem Talmud; there is also a Tosefta for this tractate.

Kil’ayim is the fourth tractate in the order Zera'im, after Demai and before Shevi'it. In medieval genizah fragments of the Mishnah, in the Vienna manuscript (late 13th century), and in printed editions of the Tosefta, however, it is sixth, coming after Terumot and Shevi'it and this position follows the general principle that the tractates are arranged in descending order according to the number of their chapters.

In the Tosefta, Kil’ayim appears as the sixth tractate, and is divided into five chapters.

There is no Gemara in the Babylonian Talmud for this tractate, or indeed for any of the tractates of this order of the Mishna, other than tractate Berakhot, as the laws related to agriculture that they mostly discuss generally have no practical application outside of the Land of Israel.

The topics of the chapters are as follows:

- Chapter 1 lists of the various kinds of grain, legumes and other vegetables, herbs and trees which constitute one species and to which, therefore, the prohibition of kil'ayim does not apply; or which plants and animals, although alike in some way, are two distinct species and would constitute mixed species with one another (in the case of trees, making grafting prohibited); how the different trees form kil'ayim with one another and with plants, and how plants form kil'ayim with one another.
- Chapter 2 discusses methods of sowing and the shape of the plots of land in which it is permissible to sow species that may not be mixed together; what must be done to plant grain in a field already sown with different grain, or to plant trees in a grain field; the distances between the beds to plant different plants in the same field; and what is to be done when different seeds are already sown in a prohibited fashion.
- Chapter 3 discusses the methods of sowing vegetables of different species and defines the distances between beds of vegetables; the distances between grain and herbs; separation of different species by visible barriers or distances; procedures for changing a field over from one crop to another without leaving forbidden traces of the previous crop; and various ways of planning a field so as to be able grow several species of greens of legumes in a small patch by separating them into distinct geometric patterns.
- Chapter 4 examines how large a space must be left in the vineyard or between the vineyard and its hedge if other seeds are sown there and how the hedge must be made, so that one may plant outside it.
- Chapter 5 continues to examine cases regarding vineyards, such when a ruined vineyard may still be used and what plants must be removed from a vineyard when they grow there wild.
- Chapter 6 continues the issues regarding vineyards, such as leaning a vine against fruit-bearing and non-fruit bearing trees, and when vine-shoots trail over a hedge or a tree.
- Chapter 7 examines the issues of vines and cuttings, including when seeds are sown over or close to vine-shoots that grow underground and emerge above ground further away; which vines do not affect the grain, although one may not plant them together; and the responsibility of a person whose vines’ growth compromise another person’s plants.
- Chapter 8 considers the laws governing the crossbreeding of animals, including to what degree the various forms of crossbreeding are forbidden; and animals which may not be harnessed together either to the plow or to pull carts.
- Chapter 9 examines the prohibition against mixing fibers made from animals (such as wool) and plants (such as linen) in clothing; articles of clothing forbidden because of kil'ayim; issues concerning clothes-dealers, tailors, and imported ready-made clothing; and how fibrous materials must be sewn together to become the forbidden mixture known as shatnez.

== Historical context ==
The sages cited in Mishnah Kil’ayim cover all the generations of tannaitic activity, from Rabbi Eliezer ben Jacob who lived during the Second Temple period through the second generation of Tannaim including Rabbi Tarfon, Rabbi Eliezer ben Hurcanus, Rabbi Joshua ben Hananiah, and Rabbi Ishmael, to the scholars of Yavne, Rabbi Akiva and his principal disciples, Rabbi Meir, Rabbi Judah bar Ilai, Rabbi Jose ben Halafta, and Rabbi Simeon bar Yochai.

More than 60 species of plants are named in this tractate and more are mentioned in the Tosefta and the Jerusalem Talmud. Many of the mishnayot discuss the methods of plowing and sowing and care of field crops, fruit trees, and especially vines. Hence this tractate is an important source for understanding ancient Israelite agriculture, horticulture and viticulture.

== Commentaries ==
Medieval commentaries on this tractate include the following:

- The Ribmatz, one of the earliest known comprehensive commentaries on Seder Zera'im, written in the early 12th century by Rabbi Isaac ben Melchizedek of Siponto.
- The Rash Sirilio, the earliest known comprehensive commentary on a large portion of the Jerusalem Talmud of Rabbi Shlomo Sirilio (1485-1558), appears in the Mutzal Mi’Eish edition of the Jerusalem Talmud for tractate Kil’ayim (but not in the Vilna edition).
- Mahara Fulda and its companion, Tosefot Maharaf, are the commentaries of Rabbi Eliyahu of Fulda, published in Amsterdam in 1710. Many later commentators refer to him only as HaMefareish (The Commentator).
- Kaftor VaFerach, by Rabbi Ishtori Haparchi, a disciple of the Rosh, one of the few surviving compositions of the Rishonim concerning Seder Zeraim; Ishtori, who was born in Provence in about 1280 emigrated to the Land of Israel, where he studied the laws applying to the Land; his work was first published in Venice in 1546.
- Pnei Moshe, the only commentary on all of the Jerusalem Talmud, by Rabbi Moshe Margolies and first published in Amsterdam in 1775.
- The Vilna Gaon worked to correct many of the textual errors in the Jerusalem Talmud. His rectifications are contained in marginal glosses published under the title Hagahot HaGra.
- A commentary known as the Ridvaz on nearly all the tractates of the Jerusalem Talmud was first published in Piotrków in 1898, with its companion commentary, Tosefot HaRid, by Rabbi Yaakov Dovid Wilovsky of Slutzk and later of Safed (1845-1914).
- The Commentary of Rabbi Nathan, President of the Academy, Pirush Rabbeinu Nathan, an 11th-century Mishnah commentary written in Judeo-Arabic, and translated into Hebrew by R. Yosef Qafih.

In modern times, the following have been published:

- Toldot Yitzchak and its companion Tevunah, by Rabbi Yitzchok Isaac Krasilschikov of Poltava, who wrote his commentary in the Soviet Union before he died in Moscow in 1965; the Machon Mutzal MeiEish edition of Seder Zeraim of the Jerusalem Talmud includes Krasilschikov's work and all the major commentators published up to that time.
- Sha'arei Emunah, the commentary of Rabbi Chaim Kanievsky to the Jerusalem Talmud, has been published on Sedarim Zeraim and Moed, in Bnei Brak, Israel.
- Aruch Ha'Shulchan He'Atid is a compendium of halachot written by Rabbi Yechiel Michel Epstein of Novaradok (1829-1902), who also composed the standard Aruch HaShulchan; it was published posthumously in Jerusalem in 1938 and the first volume deals with the laws of Seder Zeraim.
- Torat HaAretz is a work on the agricultural laws, authored by Rabbi Moshe Kliers of Tiberias, published in Jerusalem in 1928 (with a second edition published in 1972).
- Mikdash David is the work of Rabbi David HaKohen Rappaport (1890-1942), a Torah scholar who was murdered in the Holocaust and whose work contains a section pertaining to Seder Zeraim.
- Chazon Ish is a work by Rabbi Avrohom Yeshaya Karelitz covering a good part of the Mishnah and Talmud; his writings on Seder Zeraim, originally published in Bnei Brak in 1958, have influenced contemporary halakha in Israel regarding agricultural matters.

Works that are of assistance interpreting the many botanical references in the tractate include:

- Feliks, Yehudah (1963). Ha-Ḥakla'ut be-Ereẓ Yisrael bi-Tekufat ha-Mishnah ve-ha-Talmud (in Hebrew). Jerusalem, Israel. "(Agriculture in the Land of Israel during the time of the Mishna and the Talmud)"
- Oelbaum, Chaim Tzvi (2008). Mesorot HaZihuy Shel Tzimchei Mishnat Kilayim. Ramat Gan, Israel: Bar Ilan University. (monograph which identifies the plant names mentioned in the commentaries of the Rishonim).
- Amar, Zohar. Machberet Tzimchei HaMishnah shel Rabbi Yosef Kafich (in Hebrew). Bar Ilan University. "Notes on Plants of the Mishnah of Rabbi Yosef Kafich" (Rabbi Yosef Kafich in his notes to Rambam's Commentary in Arabic identifies numerous species by their Latin equivalents)

== See also ==
- Kil'ayim (prohibition)
