= Demai (tractate) =

Third tractate of Seder Zeraim of the Mishnah and of the Talmud

Tractate of the Talmud
- English: Doubtfully tithed produce
- Seder: Zeraim
- Number of mishnahs: 53
- Chapters: 7
- Babylonian Talmud pages: -
- Jerusalem Talmud pages: 34
- Tosefta chapters: 8

Demai (Hebrew: דְּמַאי, is the third tractate of Seder Zeraim ("Order of Seeds") of the Mishnah and of the Talmud. It deals with the Jewish legal concept of demai, meaning doubtfully tithed produce, and concerns the laws related to agricultural produce about which it is suspected that certain obligatory tithes have not been separated in accordance with requirements derived from the Torah. The tithes in question are ma'aser rishon (the first tithe, for the Levite), terumath ma'aser (the Levite's tithe to the kohen), and ma'aser sheni (the second tithe, for the owner to consume in Jerusalem) or ma'aser ani (the tithe for the poor), depending on the year of the Sabbatical year cycle.

The tractate consists of seven chapters and has a Gemara only in the Jerusalem Talmud. There is a Tosefta of eight chapters for this tractate.

== Subject matter ==
This tractate concerns the laws regarding agricultural produce about which there is a doubt as to whether the rules relating to the tithes were strictly observed. This doubtfully tithed produce is known as demai.

The background to the discussions of this tractate is that according to the Torah, Israelite farmers were obligated to separate three types of tithes:

- Ma'aser rishon – the first tithe, which had to be given to Levites, who had not been given an allotment of tribal land and therefore depended on this produce for their sustenance (Num 18:21)
- Ma'aser sheni – the second tithe, which the owner had to consume in Jerusalem, or convert into money plus a fifth of its value and reconvert into food in Jerusalem (Deut 14:22–27)
- Ma'aser ani – poor person's tithe, in place of the second tithe in the third and sixth year of the seven-year cycle in the sabbatical year (Deut. 14:22–29 and Deut. 26:12–15).

The Levites also had to contribute from the tithe that they received from the Israelites to the kohanim, consisting of a tenth part of the tithe they had received; it was called terumath ma'aser (offering from the tithe) or ma'aser min ha-ma'aser (tithe from the tithe) (Num 18:26).

During the period of the Second Temple, doubt began to arise among scrupulous observers of the law (known as haverim) as to whether produce had been properly tithed when they bought from farmers who were likely to be uneducated, or unscrupulous about separating the tithes. This type of individual was known as an am ha'aretz (person of the land), someone whose trustworthiness was questionable.

The am ha'aretz was not suspected of not giving terumah (gifts to the priests), because it required only a small payment comprising one-hundredth of the produce, and because terumah had a degree of sanctity that made it a severe transgression for a non-priest to eat.

However, because it was doubtful whether the produce of the am ha'aretz had been tithed, the haverim who bought grain from them had to designate part of the produce as ma'aser (a tithe for the Levites or the poor) and ma'aser min ha-ma'aser (a tenth part of that tithe), albeit in a way that reduced financial loss.

Of general note in this tractate are disputes between the Houses of Shammai and Hillel, the sages from Yavne, as well as material from the generation of Usha contained in this tractate.

One of the earliest uses of the concept of "monopoly" in a commercial sense appears in this tractate, regarding the purchasing of agricultural goods from a dealer who has a monopoly on the produce (chapter 5; 4).

The Gemara contains a few passages of Aggadah. For example, the conscientiousness of Rabbi Pinchas ben Yair regarding the laws of tithes is described along with other acts of piety for which he was well-known.

== Structure ==
The tractate consists of seven chapters and 53 paragraphs (mishnayot). It has a Gemara – rabbinical analysis of and commentary on the Mishnah – only in the Jerusalem Talmud; it also has Tosefta.

There is no Gemara in the Babylonian Talmud for this tractate or indeed for any of the tractates of this order of the Mishna, other than tractate Berakhot, as the laws related to agriculture that they discuss generally have no practical application outside of the Land of Israel.

Demai, with its seven chapters, is an exception to the usual pattern of arranging the tractates in order according to the numbers of their chapters; it appears third in the Mishnah and Jerusalem Talmud, and in most manuscripts of the Tosefta, before tractates with more chapters.

The Tosefta has a few modifications and additions. It divides Chapter 2 of the Mishna into two parts, and thus has eight chapters instead of the seven of the Mishnah. The eighth paragraph of the sixth chapter of the Mishnah corresponds to the beginning of the eighth chapter of the Tosefta.

An overview of the topics of the chapters is as follows:

- Chapter 1 details the cases of products that are exempt from the rules of demai such as fruit or vegetables which are hefker (unclaimed or ownerless property).
- Chapter 2 lists the products to which the rules of demai apply even outside the Land of Israel if it is bought from an am ha’aretz; discusses how a person may be certified as a ne'eman (one who is deemed trustworthy with respect to tithing), or as a ḥaver who is also trusted on matters of purity; and the duty of merchants regarding tithing demai produce.
- Chapter 3 considers the rules for giving or leaving demai for other people to use and specifies that a haver must not cause others to consume demai.
- Chapter 4 considers the rules of eating demai produce with people who are not trustworthy, and when buying it from them is allowed.
- Chapter 5 examines the rules about tithing demai produce bought from several people, and about tithing produce of one kind for produce of another kind.
- Chapter 6 examines the rules of tithing produce of rented or leased land or trees, of tithing the produce of partners and heirs, of produce sold in lands bordering the Land of Israel, and of produce bought for an am ha'aretz.
- Chapter 7 considers the rules for the tithing of food consumed with an am ha'aretz, rules of tithing by 'designation', and the rules concerning mixtures and regulations for the tithing of demai on urgent occasions.

== Commentaries ==
Commentaries on this tractate include the following:

- The Rash Sirilio is the earliest known comprehensive commentary on a large portion of the Jerusalem Talmud is that of Rabbi Shlomo Sirilio (1485–1558). In the Vilna edition of the Jerusalem Talmud it appears only for tractates Berakhot and Pe'ah; but the commentary for the entire Seder Zeraim, including tractate Demai, appears in the Mutzal Mi'Eish edition of the Jerusalem Talmud. In addition to his commentary, Rash Sirilio worked to remove mistakes made by manuscript copyists that over time had slipped into the text of the Jerusalem Talmud and his amended text of the Gemara is reproduced alongside his commentary in the Vilna and Mutzal Mi'Eish editions of the Jerusalem Talmud.
- Mahara Fulda and its companion, Tosefot Maharaf, are the commentaries of Rabbi Eliyahu of Fulda, published in Amsterdam in 1710. Many later commentators refer to him only as HaMefareish (The Commentator).
- Pnei Moshe, the only commentary that covers all of the Jerusalem Talmud completely was written by Rabbi Moshe Margolies, where it was first published in Amsterdam in 1775.
- The Vilna Gaon also worked to correct many of the textual errors in the text of the Jerusalem Talmud and his rectifications are contained in marginal glosses published under the title Hagahot HaGra. In addition, a work known as Beurei HaGra, was written by his disciples based on his comments. Two versions of this commentary exist, based on manuscripts written by different disciples.
- A commentary known as the Ridvaz on nearly all the tractates of the Jerusalem Talmud was first published in Piotrków in 1898, with its companion commentary, Tosefot HaRid, by Rabbi Yaakov Dovid Wilovsky of Slutzk and later of Safed (1845–1914).

In modern times, two comprehensive works have been published:

- Toldot Yitzchak and its companion Tevunah, by Rabbi Yitzchok Isaac Krasilschikov of Poltava, who wrote his commentary in the Soviet Union before he died in Moscow in 1965. The manuscript was smuggled out of Communist Russia by Rabbi Harry Bronstein, who founded Machon Mutzal MeiEish and published a new edition of Seder Zeraim of the Jerusalem Talmud, which included Rabbi Krasilschikov's work and all the major commentators published up to that time.
- Sha'arei Emunoh, the commentary of Rabbi Chaim Kanievsky to the Jerusalem Talmud has been published to date on Sedarim Zeraim and Moed. It is based on lectures given by Rabbi Kanievsky and contains explanations from earlier commentators, as well as many original insights; the volume on Demai was published in Bnei Brak, Israel, in 2002.

In addition to the commentaries listed to the above, commentaries specific to tractate Demai, or to the laws of demai are the following:

- Kaftor VaFerach, by Rabbi Ishtori Haparchi, a disciple of the Rosh, is one of the few surviving compositions of the Rishonim concerning Seder Zeraim. Rabbi Ishtori was born in Provence in about 1280 and emigrated to the Land of Israel, where he absorbed himself in the study of the halachot applying to the Land. His work was first published in Venice in 1546.
- Maharam Chaviv by Rabbi Moshe ibn Chaviv of Salonika (17th century) wrote a commentary to the Jerusalem Talmud's tractate Demai, as well as to the Jerusalem Talmud's tractates Berakhot and Peah. This commentary was also named Pnei Moshe, but to distinguish it from the more well-known commentary of that name by Moshe Margolies, it is sometimes referred to as Maharam Chaviv. Extant only as a manuscript from the time of its composition, it was first published by Machon Yerushalayim in 1994.
- Pe'at HaShulchan is a work on the laws pertaining to agriculture, written by Rabbi Yisroel ben Shmuel of Shklov (1770–1839), a disciple of the Vilna Gaon and first published in Safed in 1836. It contains two sections, the basic laws, which are mostly adopted from Maimonides, and a section of broader discussion called Beis Yisrael.
- Aruch Ha'Shulchan He'Atid is a compendium of halachot written by Rabbi Yechiel Michel Epstein of Novaradok (1829–1902), who also composed the standard Aruch HaShulchan. It was published posthumously in Jerusalem in 1938 and the first volume deals with the laws of Seder Zeraim.
- Torat HaAretz is a work on the agricultural laws, authored by Rabbi Moshe Kliers of Tiberias, published in Jerusalem in 1928 (with a second edition published in 1972).
- Mikdash David is the work of Rabbi David HaKohen Rappaport (1890–1942), a Torah scholar who was murdered in the Holocaust and whose work contains a section pertaining to Seder Zeraim.
- Chazon Ish is a wide-ranging work by Rabbi Avrohom Yeshaya Karelitz covering a good part of the Mishnah and Talmud. Chazon Ish's writings on Seder Zeraim in particular have been influential in establishing contemporary halachah in Israel regarding agricultural matters. Chazon Ish's work on Seder Zeraim, including a section on Demai, was originally published in Bnei Brak in 1958.
- Chidushim U'Veurim of Rabbi Moshe Feinstein is an extensive work on the Jerusalem Talmud's tractate Demai and is published in the Machon Mutzal MeiEish edition of the Jerusalem Talmud.
- Eretz HaBechirah is a multi-volume work on Seder Zeraim by Rabbi Yosef Tzvi Weiner of Jerusalem; the volume on tractate Demai was published in Jerusalem in 1998.
- Emunas Eliezer is a commentary on the Mishna of tractate Demai by Rabbi Eliezer Ephraim Sherwinter, published in Fallsburg, NY in 2007.
- Mishnas Avraham is a work on various tractates in Seder Zeraim by Rabbi Avraham HaLevi Stewart; the volume on Demai was published in Jerusalem in 2007.
- Birkat Yisrael by Rabbi Yisrael Moshe Fried, in collaboration with others, was published in Jerusalem in 2008 as part of a volume containing a critical edition of the Jerusalem Talmud's tractate Demai with commentaries. In addition to its original comments, Birkat Yisrael cites many earlier works.
- Kav VeNaki is a commentary as well as a section of insights to tractate Demai co-authored by Rabbi Yehudah Levi and Rabbi Gershon Metzger, published in Jerusalem in 2005.

Works that are of assistance interpreting the many botanical references in tractate Demai include the following:

- Feliks, Yehudah (1983). HaTzome'ach Ve'Ha'Chai Ba'Mishnah (in Hebrew). Jerusalem, Israel. "(Flora and Fauna in the Mishna)"
- Oelbaum, Chaim Tzvi (2008). Mesorot HaZihuy Shel Tzimchei Mishnat Kilayim. Ramat Gan, Israel: Bar Ilan University. (monograph which identifies the plant names mentioned in the commentaries of the Rishonim).
- Amar, Zohar. Machberet Tzimchei HaMishnah shel Rabbi Yosef Kafich (in Hebrew). Bar Ilan University. "Notes on Plants of the Mishnah of Rabbi Yosef Kafich" (Rabbi Yosef Kafich in his notes to Rambam's Commentary in Arabic identifies numerous species by their Latin equivalents)

== Historical context ==
The contents of this tractate mostly reflect conditions in Judea and the Galilee during the second century C.E. and particularly the conditions in the Galilee after the Bar Kokhba revolt (132–136 C.E.). Most of the Tannaim whose opinions are recorded in this tractate are from this period.

The tractate contains data about the social life and institutions of the time and the social and commercial relations between the various segments of the population, such as the chaver, the am haaretz, employers and workers, and innkeepers and their guests. The Gemara in the Jerusalem Talmud indicates that there were inspectors who distinguished between produce that was properly tithed (metukan) and the demai, and that there were also officers appointed to watch the sale of articles of food and keep the prices low.

The Gemara also has considerable information about the produce of the Land of Israel. Many names of fruits and vegetables, in addition to those mentioned in the Mishnah, are cited in the Gemara, along with information about the markets and names of places inside and outside the Land of Israel.
