= Kil'ayim =

Kil'ayim may refer to:

- kil'ayim (prohibition), the multi-faceted prohibition of crossbreeding seeds, crossbreeding animals and mixing wool and linen
- kil'ayim (tractate), a tractate of the Talmud that deals with these laws
