= Terumot =

Talmudic treatise

Tractate of the Talmud
- English: Priestly dues
- Seder: Zeraim
- Number of mishnahs: 101
- Chapters: 11
- Babylonian Talmud pages: -
- Jerusalem Talmud pages: 59
- Tosefta chapters: 10

Terumot (Hebrew: תְּרוּמוֹת, lit. "Priestly dues" and often, "heave-offering") is the sixth tractate of Seder Zeraim ("Order of Seeds") of the Mishnah and of the Jerusalem Talmud. This tractate discusses the laws of teruma, a gift of produce that an Israelite farmer was required to set aside and give to a kohen (priest). There were two kinds of terumot given to the priest: the regular heave-offering, known also as the terumah gedolah ("great heave-offering"), which the Israelites were required to give to the priest from the produce of their fields; the other was the terumat ma'aser ("tithe of the heave-offering"), namely, the gift that the Levites were required to put aside for the priests from the tithe which ordinary Israelites had been required to give to them.

The laws detailed in this tractate are derived from the Torah in Numbers 18:8, 11–12 and Deut 18:4–5, and for terumat ma'aser from Numbers 18:25–32.

The mitzvah (commandment) applies only to produce grown in the Land of Israel and continues to be observed in the modern state of Israel.

This tractate comprises eleven chapters in the Mishna and ten in the Tosefta and has fifty-nine folio pages of Gemara in the Jerusalem Talmud. Like most tractates in the order of Zeraim, there is no Babylonian Talmud for this tractate. Laws concerning terumah are also mentioned in the tractates Demai and Ma'aserot.

== Subject matter ==
The first-fruits of your grain, of your wine, and of your oil, and the first of the fleece of your sheep, you shall give him. For the Lord your God has chosen him out of all your tribes, to stand to minister in the name of the Lord, him and his sons for ever.

— Deuteronomy 18:4-5

This tractate focuses on the laws of the gifts of produce that are to be given to a kohen (priest) as mandated by the Torah. Terumah is the first gift that must be separated from the produce and given to the priest, as prescribed in Numbers (Num 18:8, 11–12 and Numbers 18:25–32) and Deuteronomy (Deut 18:4–5).

The Hebrew term terumah signifies a contribution, an offering for a sacred purpose, and more literally, something lifted up (hence the antiquated English translation, heave offering). (Note: The same term, terumah, was also used with regards to the half-shekel contributions made to the Temple fund for sacred needs (terumat ha-lishkah). This terumah is not dealt with in this tractate.) In the Torah, the commandment applied to grain, wine and oil; the Mishna extends the scope to include all produce. It also applied only in the Land of Israel, but certain lands bordering the Land of Israel, and Babylonia were later included.

Since the priests and Levites were not allocated land in of the Land of Israel, they were provided for in the form of tithes given to the Levites and the terumot offerings given to the priests by both the Levites and the ordinary Israelites. The Levites were required to separate and give the priest one-tenth of the tithe that they received from the Israelite farmers and this was called terumat ma'aser ("offering of the tithe"), or ma’aser min hama’aser (tithe of the tithe). The Israelites, on the other hand, separated the terumah gedolah to be given to the priests before they separated a tenth of the produce to be given as tithe to the Levites. Both types of gifts come under the general term of terumah, which forms the theme of this tractate, but the terumah gedolah of the Israelite farmers comprises the main subject of discussion.

The Torah does not specify the amount of terumah that must be given, and theoretically, even one single kernel of grain could suffice; thus the Mishna in this tractate establishes an amount, from one-fortieth to one-sixtieth of the gross product, depending on the circumstances and generosity of the individual farmer, with one-fiftieth being regarded as the average gift. The generally accepted measure is therefore one-fiftieth, and the Sages found an allusion to this amount in the term terumah as an acronym of the Aramaic words trei mi-meah ("two from a hundred") or 2%.

The tractate deals with the details of many circumstances which could arise with regards to the terumah. Thus, for example, before the terumah is separated, all the produce is tevel (untithed) and forbidden to be eaten. Terumah is considered holy, and may be eaten by priests only, as prescribed in Leviticus 22:10, and must be guarded against becoming ritually unclean, lost or wasted, as interpreted from Numbers 18:8. The Mishna also considers what to do in cases where terumah became mixed with non-sacred food; if the ratio is less than one hundred times that of terumah, it determines that all of it becomes forbidden to non-priests. However, it is not necessary to give the mixture to the priest, rather it is sold to a priest at the price of terumah, which was fixed lower than ordinary produce, while deducting the value of the terumah mixed into it. If the ratio of non-sacred food exceeds one hundred-times than that of the terumah, a non-priest may eat it, after removing the quantity of the terumah that had fallen into it and giving it to the priest.

== Structure and content ==
The tractate consists of eleven chapters and 101 paragraphs (mishnayot). It has a Gemara – rabbinical analysis of and commentary on the Mishnah – of 59 double-sided pages in the Jerusalem Talmud. There is a Tosefta of ten chapters for this tractate.

There is no Gemara in the Babylonian Talmud for this tractate, or indeed for any of the tractates of this order of the Mishnah, other than Tractate Berakhot, as the laws related to agriculture and produce that are mostly discussed in this order generally have no practical application outside of the Land of Israel.

In most editions of the Mishnah, this tractate is sixth in the order Zera'im. Maimonides, in his Commentary on the Mishnah, states that this tractate follows Shevi'it since terumah is the first gift which one separates from the produce.

An overview of the topics of the chapters is as follows:

- Chapter 1 discusses the categories of people who may not set aside terumah and the different cases in which terumah is considered valid even if the method by which it was selected was generally not permissible.
- Chapter 2 deals with additional cases in which the terumah is valid, if the method of selecting it was unknowingly incorrect.
- Chapter 3 examines when terumah had to be given twice, the authority of an owner to delegate a servant to take terumah, in what order various offerings, such as terumah and the tithe are to be given, and the procedure to be followed if someone makes a verbal error while selecting the terumah or during the consecration of a sacrifice or taking of an oath.
- Chapter 4 deals with the amount of the terumah gedolah offered by the Israelite and with the terumat ma’aser of the Levite, which must be given according to measure, and situations where terumah has been mixed with other produce.
- Chapter 5 continues the discussion of handling mixtures, in these cases of ritually clean and unclean produce for terumah.
- Chapter 6 deals with the compensation that must be made for improperly eating or deriving benefit from terumah.
- Chapter 7 concerns further cases of mixtures and cases when both the value and an additional fifth of the value had to be repaid on eating terumah.
- Chapter 8 continues the topic of mixtures and introduces the subject of the wine of terumah that had been left uncovered and the dangers of poisoning, and the prohibition against intentionally defiling the terumah, along with other situations of defilement.
- Chapter 9 defines the process to follow when terumah has been deliberately or unintentionally sown and rules concerning the handling of produce grown from the sowing of terumah grains or fruit.
- Chapter 10 enumerates the cases in which the flavor of terumah makes other foods forbidden and other rules about which permissible foods become forbidden through the flavor acquired from prohibited foods.
- Chapter 11 discusses the uses that may be made of ritually clean and unclean terumah both in solid and in liquid forms.

== Historical context and influence ==
The commandment of terumah applies only to produce grown in the Land of Israel and continues to be observed in the modern state of Israel. There is debate among Jewish legal authorities as to whether the present-day Jewish religious laws detailed in this tractate are now biblically or rabbinically mandated obligations.

Mishna 8:12 of this tractate is a digression from the laws of terumah but is included in this tractate because it contains a similar case to the preceding mishna about pagans' intent to cause defilement – in the previous Mishna of a commodity and in this one, of a person. This Mishna has become a source of Jewish law for the general principle that it is not permitted to sacrifice one individual to save another. Tosefta 7:23 of this tractate, quoted in the Jerusalem Talmud (Talmud, y. Terumot 47a) expands the ruling of the Mishna to a case where if one member of a group is not delivered to be killed, the entire group will be killed. The ruling is the same as in the Mishna, that all should die rather than sacrifice one to save the others. However, if one individual was specified by the persecutors, then other factors can be considered, such as whether that individual is already subject to capital punishment for a crime they have committed. Many medieval and modern Jewish legal scholars have grappled with the practical applications of the cases mentioned in this tractate, often when facing situations involving persecution, in the Middle Ages during the Crusades, the Rintfleisch massacres or other anti-Jewish violence, and in modern times during the Holocaust.

== Commentaries ==
Medieval commentaries on this tractate include the following:

- Rambam, Maimonides' Commentary on the Mishnah
- Rash, a commentary by Rabbi Shimshon of Sens (c. 1150–1230), printed in the Mutzal Me'esh edition of the Jerusalem Talmud, and in the Vilna edition of the Talmud printed in 1880
- Chiddushei Ha'Ritva by Rabbi Yom Tov Asevilli of Seville (c. 1260–1314), included in the Vilna edition of the Talmud
- Rosh, the commentary of Rabbenu Asher (c.1250–1327), printed in the Mutzal Me'esh edition of the Jerusalem Talmud.
- The Bartenura commentary on the Mishnah by Rabbi Ovadiah ben Abraham of Bertinoro (c. 1445–1515), included in the Vilna edition of the Talmud
- Rash Sirilio, the comprehensive commentary on a large portion of the Jerusalem Talmud by Rabbi Solomon Sirilio (1485–1554), appears in the Mutzal Mi’Eish edition of the Jerusalem Talmud. His commentary is cited regularly by Melekhet Shlomo.

Commentaries by later scholars include the following:

- Tosefet Yom Tov, by Rabbi Yom-Tov Lipmann Heller, published between 1614 and 1617, and printed the Vilna edition of the Talmud
- Mahara Fulda, the commentaries of Rabbi Elijah of Fulda on the Jerusalem Talmud, published in Amsterdam in 1710
- Lechem Shamayim by Rabbi Jacob Emden (1697–1776)
- Shoshanim LeDavid by Rabbi David Pardo of Venice, first published in 1752
- Tiferes Yisrael by Rabbi Israel Lipschitz of Danzig (1782-1860), printed in the Vilna edition of the Talmud
- Mishnas Rabbi Nathan by Rabbi Nathan Adler, first published in Frankfurt, 1862
