= Kil'ayim (prohibition) =

Jewish laws concerning the prohibition of diverse kinds

Halakhic texts relating to this article
- Torah: Leviticus 19:19 and Deuteronomy 22:9–11
- Jerusalem Talmud: Tractate Kilayim
- Mishneh Torah: Hilchot Kilayim
- Shulchan Aruch: Yoreh De'ah, 295-304

Kil'ayim (or Klayim; Hebrew: כִּלְאַיִם, romanized: kilʾayim, lit. 'hybrid, mixture, diverse kinds') are the prohibitions in Jewish law which proscribe the planting of certain mixtures of seeds, grafting, the mixing of plants in vineyards, the crossbreeding of animals, the formation of a team in which different kinds of animals work together, and shatnez, or the mixing of wool with linen in garments.

The prohibitions are derived from the Torah in Leviticus 19:19 and Deuteronomy 22:9–11, and the Mishnah in tractate Kilʾayim, which has a Gemara in the Jerusalem Talmud, further elaborates on the applicable circumstances.

== Prohibitions ==
The Torah (Leviticus 19:19; Deuteronomy 22:9–11) lists several different examples of mixtures that are prohibited as mixed species. The halakha classifies the prohibitions under the following categories:

- interbreeding of animals of different species
- planting mixed seeds
- grafting of different species of trees
- shatnez - mixing wool and linen in garments
- planting grain or seed crops in a vineyard
- ploughing or doing other work with two different species of animal.

== Permitted and forbidden instances ==
=== In fabrics ===
The 613 commandments in the Hebrew Bible forbid the wearing of shatnez – wool and linen fabrics that have been hackled together, or spun and woven together. Likewise, "intertying" sheep wool and linen together is forbidden, the two exceptions being the məʿīl or robe of the Temple priests and the tzitzit. Concerning tzitzit, the Chazal "Sages" of Rabbinic Judaism permit using wool and linen strings in tandem only when genuine tekhelet dye is available, whereas kabbalist sources go a step further by encouraging this practice. The Torah forbids only wool and linen to be worn together. Camel hair, cashmere wool, yak fiber, and the like are not prohibited from being worn with linen.

According to Maimonides, if a Jew had purchased an all-woolen product from a gentile and wanted to ascertain whether or not it was, indeed, pure wool – without the admixture of flax-linen, its fabric could be tested by dyeing. A dye solution applied to the fabric would reveal whether it was pure wool, as wool and linen products do not retain the same shades in a dye solution.

=== In plantings ===
The prohibition of sowing together diverse seedlings is derived from the biblical verse, "You shall not sow your field with two kinds of seed" (Leviticus 19:19), and which prohibition has been explained to mean planting or sowing two or more diverse vegetable crops within a radius of three-handbreadths, ca. 27 centimetres (11 in), from one another, where they draw nutrients from each other. As a first resort, however, one is to distance two or more diverse vegetable crops from each other at a remove of six-handbreadths, ca. 54 centimetres (21 in), even if their foliage were to grow and intermix. Two or more diverse seed-crops must be distanced enough so as to be distinguished from each other as two separate plantings. The prohibition not only applies to sowing together diverse kinds, but also hoeing the ground wherein diverse kinds were sown together, as well as covering them over in top soil, whether by one's foot, or by hand, or by any implement. The same prohibition applies to when they were sown together in a flower pot that was perforated at the bottom. If an entire field was planted with one kind of seedling, but next to that field was another field planted with a diverse kind (whether seedlings or a vegetable crop), the separation distance between the two fields must be 10.2 cubits, about 4.9 metres (16 ft) at the very least. The laws governing diverse seed-plantings or vegetables apply only to crops grown in the Land of Israel, but do not apply to seed-crops or vegetables planted outside the Land of Israel. Likewise, these prohibitions do not apply to diverse seedlings that are planted purely for their medicinal use.

According to biblical exegete Nachmanides, the reason for its prohibition being that when seedlings draw nutrients from other seedlings, their properties and natural forms are changed thereby and the sower cancels thereby the fixed design and purpose of the universe.

Diverse seed-plantings or vegetables that grew together in violation of the biblical command are permitted to be eaten, although the crop itself must be uprooted. If two diverse grain seeds (e.g. wheat and barley) were inadvertently mixed together, they must be separated before they can be sown. If, however, there were 24 parts more of one grain than the other (ratio of 24 to 1), the lesser grain is considered cancelled by the other, and may still be sown together. If there were not 24 parts more than the mixed grain, the whole must be sorted.

==== Specific permitted and forbidden species ====
The first chapter of Mishnah Kil'ayim permits the growing together of certain plants, although the members of each pair belong to two different kinds. An example is certain species of Poaceae (the grass family). Wheat and tares belong to different genera (Triticum and Lolium, respectively), but resemble each other in both their seeds and their leaves. Tares are often found growing in wheat fields. Its seeds may germinate several years after being planted so that its growth could not always be prevented. This argument has been used to explain why it was not prohibited to have wheat and tares growing together in the same field.

The rabbinic treatise develops the principle that a planter should not only be concerned with the mixing together of different classes of items but also with the appearance of such intermixing, such that if the two kinds are similar in appearance but different genera, this can, at times, be tolerated.

The Mishnah in tractate Kilʾayim 1:1 explicitly permits faba beans (Vicia faba, Hebrew: פול) and mung beans (Vigna radiata; Vigna mungo, ספיר) to be planted together, as they are considered homogeneous. (Note: Based on the identification of this legume in R. Nathan ben Abraham's Mishnah commentary, as well as that of Maimonides, s.v. Kil'ayim 1:1) It also permits the planting of white mustard (Sinapis alba, חרדל) and of Egyptian mustard (Rhamphospermum nigrum, חרדל מצרי) together (Kil'ayim 1:2), as they, too, are considered to be homogeneous, despite being two different genera. However, white mustard (Sinapis alba, חרדל) and charlock mustard, also known as wild mustard (Sinapis arvensis, לפסן), though also similar in appearance, may not be planted together (ibid. 1:5), as they are considered heterogeneous. J. Feliks maintained that while the two vegetables are similar regarding their leaves, yellow flowers, and taste, they are considered diverse-kinds because of a difference in their roots. Accordingly, the plant's roots become the ultimate criterion for determination of some diverse kinds.

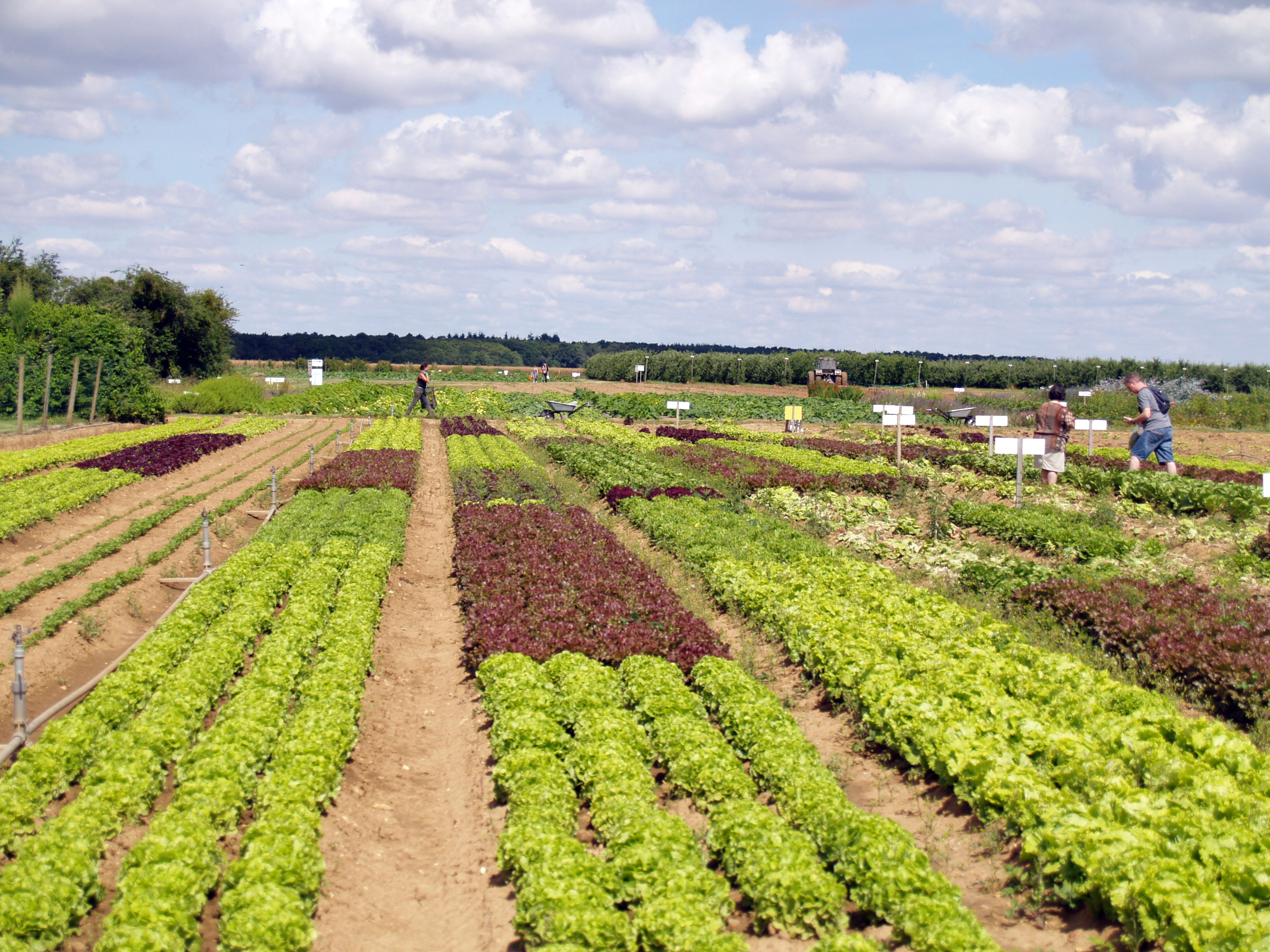
Field showing distinct plots for different species

Cucumbers (Hebrew: קשות) and muskmelons (מלפפון), (Note: On the definition of this last word, see Mishnah Commentary by Pinchas Kehati (1977), ninth edition, vol. 1 (Zera'im), s.v. Kilʾayim 1:2, who explains this fruit as "melon." The 11th-century Mishnah exegete Nathan ben Abraham I explained מלפפון milep̄eppon as Judeo-Arabic: אלכ'רבז, romanized: ilxirbiz, lit. 'muskmelon', saying that it was “one of the kinds of watermelon whose smell is sweet.” The Jerusalem Talmud, Kilʾayim 1:2, relates an ancient belief that if one were to take a seed from a watermelon and a seed from an apple and then place them together in an impression made in the earth, the two seeds would fuse and become diverse kinds. "It is for this reason," says the narrator of the Talmud, "that they call it (i.e. the fruit) by its Greek name. The old Greek word for "melon" was μήλο mêlo(n) apple plus πεπόν pépōn an edible (lit. ripened) [gourd], meaning literally "apple-shaped melon". This fruit, muskmelon (Cucumis melo), was thought to be a cross-breed between a watermelon and an apple. Maimonides, however, calls it in Mishna Kilʾayim 1:2 and Terumah 8:6 by the Arabic name, al-khiyyār, meaning "cucumbers" (Cucumis sativus) – which although far from an apple is in the same genus and watermelons. Talmudic exegete Solomon Sirilio (1485–1554) disputed Maimonides' view in his commentary on the Jerusalem Talmud (Kil'ayim 1:2, s.v. קישות), saying that Maimonides explained מלפפון to mean in Spanish pepinos "cucumbers" (Cucumis sativus), which, in the opinion of an early Mishnaic exegete, Isaac of Siponto (c. 1090–1160), was really to be identified as “small, round melons” (Cucumis melo), since Rabbi Yehudah in our Mishnah holds that it is a diverse kind of kishut (Armenian cucumber, H. Paris 2012 p. 2, phenotypically similar to cucumber). Nevertheless, today, in Modern Hebrew, the word מלפפון milpipon is now used to denote "cucumbers," based on Maimonides' identification.) although they are two different species, are not considered "diverse kinds" to each other and may be planted together. Rabbi Yehudah, disputing, says that they are considered "diverse kinds" to each other and cannot be planted together.

Although two different species, the Mishnah, Kilʾayim 1:3, permits planting together turnips (Brassica rapa subsp. rapa, לפת) with rapeseed (Brassica napus subsp. napus; נפוס). (Note: Although the vegetable known as nefos was called by Maimonides by the idiom 'Syrian radish,' it was not a radish since it is listed in Mishnah Kilʾayim 1:5 as being a diverse kind to the true radish (צנון). Zohar Amar suggests that it may have actually been Brassica napus; see Zohar Amar 2015, p. 113. Brassica napus has roots resembling those of parsnips and carrots. For this reason, medieval Hebraists and philologists would have classified the vegetable as a parsnip / carrot (Judeo-Arabic: אלג'זר), as did Nathan ben Abraham in his commentary of the Mishnah. Furthermore, Brassica napus and turnip (Brassica rapa) have similar leaves. For this reason, they are not considered diverse kinds to each other.) Likewise, cauliflower (Brassica oleracea botrytis, תרובתור) and kohlrabi (Brassica var. caulorapa) (כרוב), although different species, are permitted to be planted together. (Note: The Hebrew word karūb being explained by Mishnaic exegete, Rabbi Nathan ben Abraham, as having the connotation of the Judeo-Arabic: אלכלם kohlrabi. By this definition, the word karub is not to be confused with the Modern Hebrew word by the same name, now used for "cabbage" (cultivars of Brassica oleracea). See: Amar, Z.; Kapah, E. (2011), vol. 2, p. 19.) Maimonides, in his commentary on the same Mishnah, explained the word karūb as having the Judeo-Arabic connotation of כרנב, meaning either cabbage (Brassica oleracea var. capitata) or kale (Brassica oleracea var. acephala).

Conversely, radish (Raphanus raphanistrum, צנון) and rape (נפוס) cannot be planted together (Kilʾayim 1:5). Jonah maintains that while the two vegetables are similar in respect to both their leaves and their fruits, they are considered diverse-kinds because of a difference in taste. Neither can the Egyptian gourd (Cultivar of Cucumis melo, דלעת מצרית) be planted together with the Grecian gourd (Lagenaria vulgaris, דלעת יונית), as they too are heterogeneous according to Mishnah Kilʾayim 1:5)

==== Grafting of trees ====
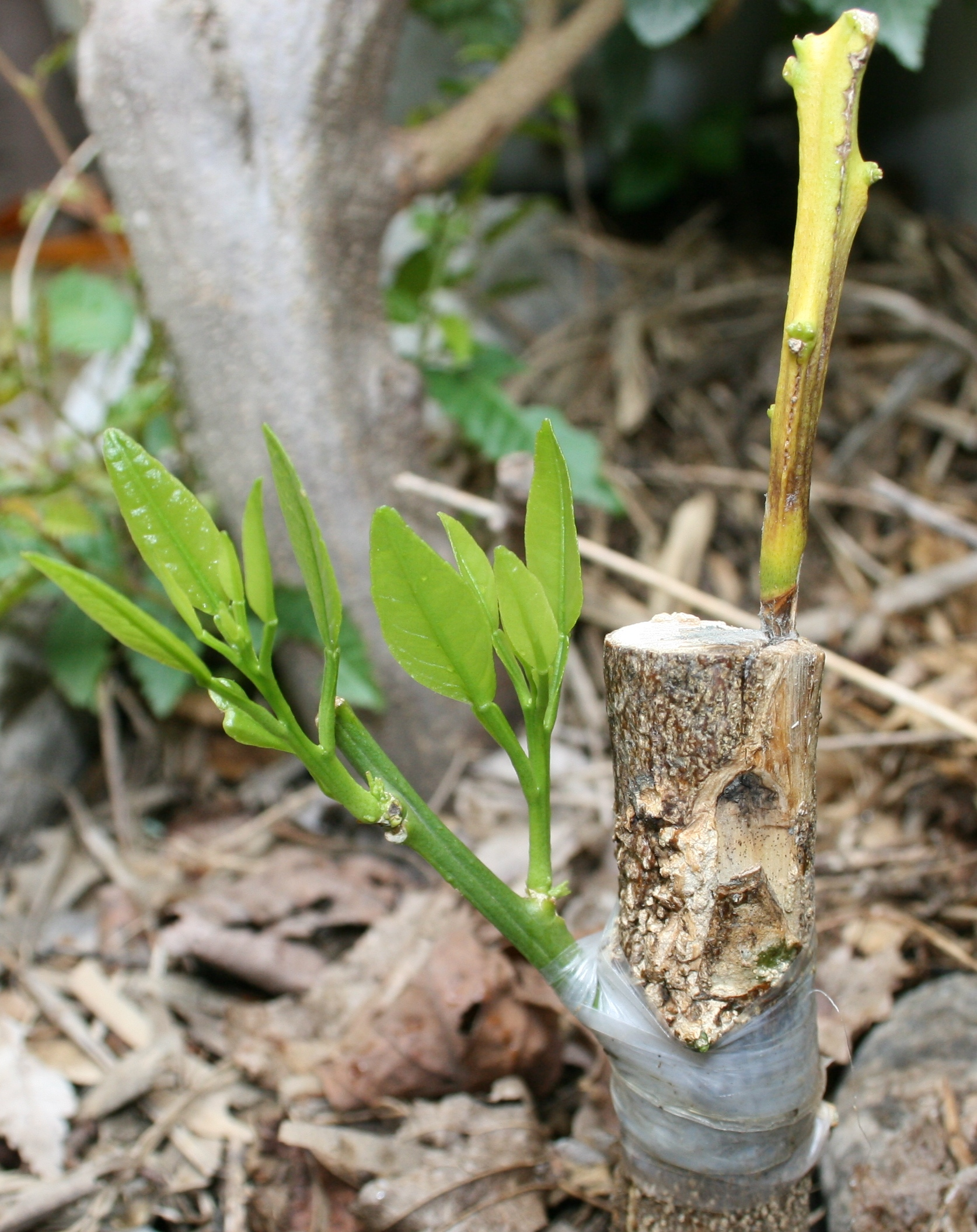
Grafting of two varieties of citrus trees

The prohibition of grafting of trees is treated on in the Mishnah (Kil'ayim 1:4). The prohibition applies to all trees, whether growing within the Land of Israel or outside. Among trees, while it is permissible to grow two different kinds of trees in close proximity to each other, it is forbidden for an Israelite (or a gentile working on behalf of an Israelite) to graft the branch (scion) of one tree onto the stump of another tree to produce thereby a hybrid fruit if the trees are not one and the same kind. Quince (Cydonia oblonga, פרישין) is named as an exception, for if a branch taken from it were grafted onto a stump belonging to hawthorn (Crataegus azarolus, עוזררין), although they are two different species, it is permitted since they are considered related in Mishna, Kil'ayim 1:4. Likewise, to graft the branch of Krustemelin (said to be the "Calaprice pears") onto the rootstock of an ordinary pear (Pyrus communis) is permitted. However, apple (Malus domestica, תפוח) grafted onto medlars (Mespilus germanica, חֻזרד), or peach (Prunus persica, פרסקין) grafted onto almond trees (Prunus dulcis, שקדים), or jujube (Ziziphus jujuba, שזפין) grafted onto Christ's thorn jujube (Ziziphus spina-christi, רימין), although similar in appearance, are "diverse kinds." The fruit produced by grafting the bud of one dissimilar tree onto the rootstock of the other are permitted to be consumed by Israel, although the trees themselves, according to some authorities, are not permitted to be maintained.

Avrohom Yeshaya Karelitz, uncertain about the identity of the trees mentioned in the Mishna owing to conflicting opinions, made it a rule to be stringent in all of them, prohibiting their grafting in all cases. A Jew who transgressed by grafting two dissimilar trees was formerly liable to flogging according to Kiddushin 39a. The prohibition applies whether the trees belong to a Jew or a gentile.

==== Vineyards ====
A vineyard (כרם kérem, plural karmim) is defined as at least five vines growing together, two of which are planted alongside an opposite row containing two vines, with the fifth vine tailing the others. A trellis (Hebrew: עריס) is where five vines are planted together in a single row.

The Chazal described the prohibition of growing diverse kinds in a vineyard strictly from a biblical perspective as referring only to two-grain varieties (such as wheat and barley) planted with a grape, or either with hemp and arum, or similar plants which reach maturity with the grain. By a rabbinic prohibition, however, it is not permitted to plant or maintain a vineyard while the vineyard shares the same immediate ground with any vegetable or seed-crop grown for food (e.g. mustard seeds, chickpeas, etc.). The result of doing so would be to cause its owner to forfeit the seed-crop together with the increase of the vineyard thereof as explained in Deuteronomy 22:9: "Lest all should be forfeited together with the increase of the vineyard." The rabbis made it incumbent upon husbandmen and vine-dressers to distance their seed crops from a vineyard. According to Maimonides, if a trellised vine of at least five plantings was made alongside a fence or a wall, even if the stumps of the grape-vines were distant from the wall one cubit, the planter of seed is only permitted to sow seed four cubits beyond the wall or fence (about two meters), since the grapevine is prone to spread itself as far as the wall. There must always be at least four cubits between a vineyard and the seed crop. Certain plants that grow of themselves in a vineyard, such as lianas (Cissus spp.), bindweed (Convolvulus spp.), sweet clover (Melilotus), the anemone (Anemone coronaria), are not accounted as "diverse kinds" in a vineyard, to cause its owner to forfeit the crop of the vineyard altogether.

If, however, either za'atar (Origanum syriacum, אזוב ezov), or whorled savory (Satureja thymbra, סיאה), or dyer's croton (Chrozophora tinctoria, לשישית), white-leaved savory (Micromeria fruticosa, קורנית), or mallows (Malva sylvestris, חילמית), grape hyacinth (Muscari commutatum, בולפסין), or saffron (Crocus spp., כרכום), Egyptian cucumber (Cucumis melo var. chate, קישואין), calabash (דלועין), muskmelon (Cucumis melo, מלפפונות), or beetroot (Beta vulgaris, בורכייר) been left to grow in a vineyard, any of these would render the entire vineyard prohibited. The common denominator between these plants is that, in the Land of Israel during Mishnaic times, if they were seen growing in places other than in a vineyard, their owners would have been interested in their upkeep and maintenance, due to some benefit derived from these plants, such as when they are used as animal fodder, or for human consumption, or for medicinal purposes. Their presence in a vineyard, if they are allowed to grow unmolested (מקיימין) shows willful negligence in what concerns this prohibitory law of Diverse kinds. The same rule applies to other plants not specifically named in the Tosefta Kil'ayim 3:12, but which plants may have special and common usage among the people of a certain place where he has made his residence, and which plants grow in his vineyard, even outside the Land of Israel.

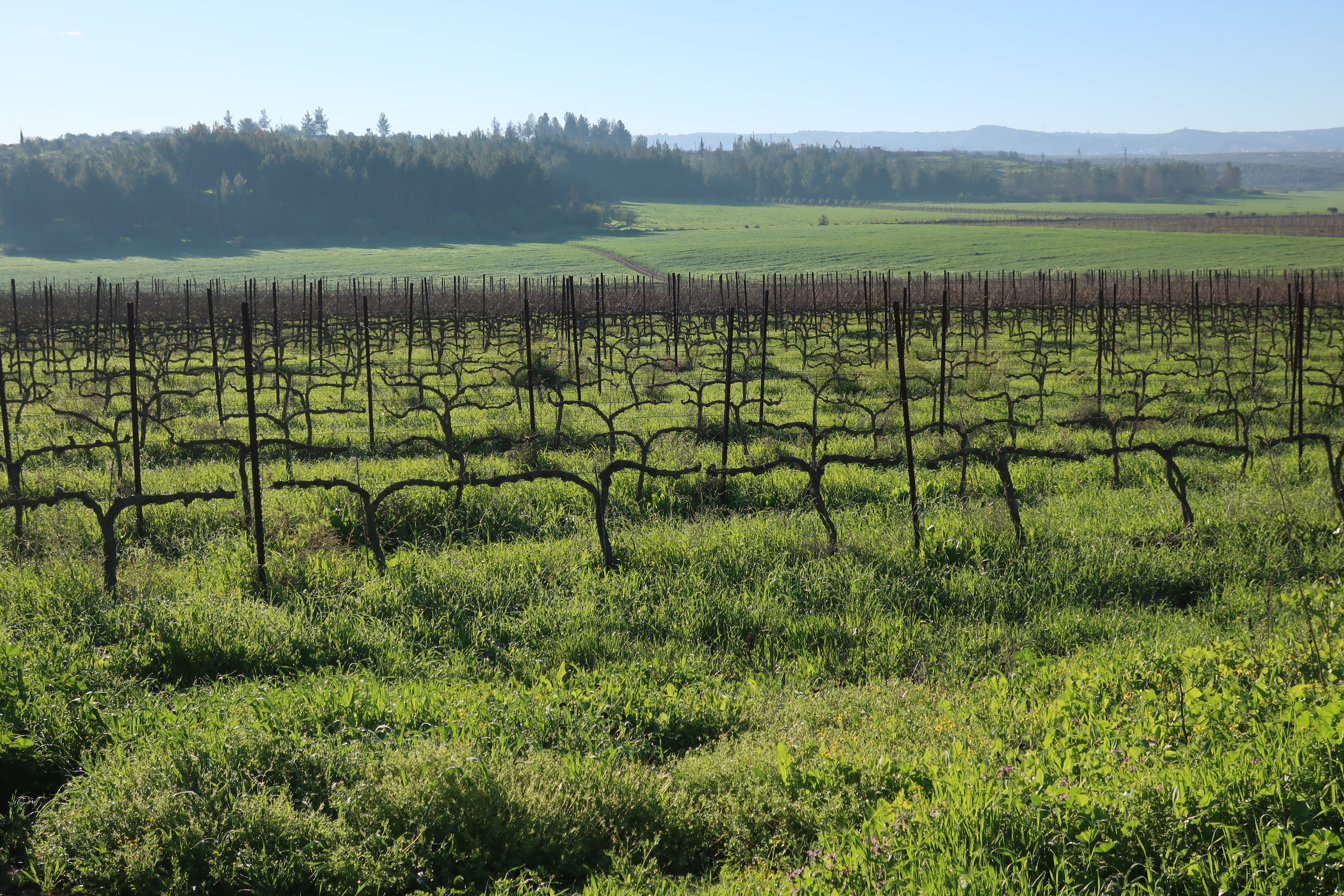
Vineyard in Israel

Suppose thorn bushes, such as camelthorn (Alhagi maurorum, ההגין) and boxthorn (Lycium shawii, אטדין), grew within a vineyard. In that case, they are not accounted as seed crops and may be sustained in a vineyard, with the rabbis giving them the classification of trees amongst trees. However, in places where thorn bushes are used as fodder for camels, and the owner of the vineyard is content to have the thorn bushes grow in his vineyard to that end, the thorn bushes, if maintained, would render the entire vineyard forbidden.

By a rabbinic injunction, the prohibition of growing diverse seed-crops in a vineyard extends to vineyards vintaged by Jews outside the Land of Israel. In reference to the mixed seed planted in a vineyard, the law is only transgressed when wheat, barley, and grape seed are sown simultaneously in that vineyard. The reason for this prohibition, according to Maimonides, is to avoid imitating the custom of the people in olden days who would sow barley and stones of grape together, in the belief that the vineyard could only prosper in this way. The planter transgresses the biblical command from the moment grain begins to take root within a vineyard, and the grapes have reached the size of cowpeas (Vigna unguiculata).

By a rabbinic decree, other seed-crops are forbidden to be planted in a vineyard. Had a person transgressed and grew a seed-crop within his vineyard, not only is the produce forbidden to be eaten, but also had he sold the produce, the proceeds accruing from the sale of such produce are also forbidden, and must be burnt, together with the vineyard. The practical bearing of this rabbinic edict is in respect of someone who came along and maliciously sowed Diverse seedlings in his neighbor's vineyard where there is beginning to grow nascent fruit. In such a case, the rabbinic authority has prohibited the seed crop (requiring its burning), but the vineyard and its fruit are still permitted. The reason for this leniency is because most seedlings sown in a vineyard are only a rabbinic prohibition, and the rabbis did not punish the owner of the vineyard in the case of another person's malfeasance. However, wherever the non-seed plants of hemp (Hebrew: קנבוס) and arum (Hebrew: לוף) were planted in a vineyard, seeing that their planting in a vineyard stands in direct violation of the Torah itself, such plantings would render the entire vineyard prohibited, requiring its burning.

=== In animals ===
The prohibition vis-à-vis animals pertains to their cross-breeding and the prohibition of plowing a field with two different species of animals coupled together, such as with an ox and donkey that are hitched together by a yoke. This prohibition applies also to hitching two kinds of animals together to pull a cart or wagon, and even if it were merely to tie them together behind a wagon. The prohibition of coupling together diverse kinds of animals applies also to tying together two species of birds. A man and his beast are permitted to plough together.

In the classification of animals, the genus Canis includes dogs, wolves, coyotes, and jackals. Even so, the mating of dogs and wolves is forbidden. The common "village dog" (Hebrew: הכלב הכופרי), said by some commentators to be the saluki, is considered a diverse kind with the fox. Similarly, mating a horse and mule (even though they cannot reproduce) is forbidden.

Though a Jew is forbidden to crossbreed a horse and a donkey (producing a hinny or mule), had a gentile bred them, it is permitted for a Jew to make use of them.

== Bibliography ==
- Aharon HaLevi (1958). Sefer ha-Chinuch (in Hebrew). Jerusalem: Eshkol. OCLC 233044594.
- Amar, Z.; Kapah, E. (2011), "The Yemenite Commentary of Rabbi Nathan, President of the Academy, on the Identification of Flora in the Mishnah", in Ayelet Oettinger; Danny Bar-Maoz (eds.), Mittuv Yosef – Yosef Tobi Jubilee Volume, The Jews of Yemen: History and Culture, vol. 2, Haifa: University of Haifa (Center for the Study of Jewish Culture in Spain and in Islamic Countries), OCLC 713933314
- Amar, Z. (2015). Flora and Fauna in Maimonides' Teachings (in Hebrew). Kfar Darom. OCLC 783455868.
- Ben Melchizedek, I. (1975). Nisan Zaks (ed.). Mishnah Zera'im, with the Commentary of Ribmaṣ (in Hebrew). Jerusalem: Makhon ha-Talmud ha-Yisraeli ha-Shalem. OCLC 745167494.
- Chazon-Ish (1994). Dinei Zera'im (Hil. Kila'im) (in Hebrew). Bnei Brak. ISBN 9004112650. OCLC 122887682.
- Halberstam, C. (2002). Questions & Responsa Divrei Chaim (in Hebrew). Vol. 1. New York. OCLC 708697367.
- Ishtori Haparchi (1999). Avraham Yosef Havatzelet (ed.). Sefer Kaftor Ve'ferah (in Hebrew). Vol. 3. Jerusalem: Bet ha-midrash la-halakhah ba-hityashvut. OCLC 32307172.
- Kanievsky, C. (1984). Derekh Emunah (Commentary on Maimonides' Mishne Torah, Hil. Kila'im) (in Hebrew) (8 ed.). Bnei Brak. ISBN 9004112650. OCLC 762353233.
- Kessar, Ḥayim (1988). Shelomo Siʼani; Siman-Tov Maghori (eds.). Maimonides' Mishne Torah, According to Ba'al Shem Tov (in Hebrew). Vol. 2. Jerusalem: S. Maghori. ISBN 9004112650. OCLC 232938817. (OCLC 122740743)
- Kiara, S. (1987). Ezriel Hildesheimer (ed.). Sefer Halachot Gedolot (in Hebrew). Vol. 3. Jerusalem. OCLC 754744801., Hil. Kil'ayim (p. 390)
- Maimonides (1974). Sefer Mishneh Torah - HaYad Ha-Chazakah (Maimonides' Code of Jewish Law) (in Hebrew). Vol. 1–7. Jerusalem: Pe'er HaTorah., s.v. Hil. Kil'ayim (vol. 4)
- Meiri (2006). Daniel Bitton (ed.). Beit HaBechirah (Chiddushei ha-Meiri) (in Hebrew). Vol. 5. Jerusalem: Hamaor Institute. OCLC 181631040.
- Nathan ben Abraham (1955), "Perush Shishah Sidrei Mishnah - A Commentary on the Six Orders of the Mishnah", in Sachs, Mordecai Yehudah Leib (ed.), The Six Orders of the Mishnah: with the Commentaries of the Rishonim (in Hebrew), vol. 1, Jerusalem: El ha-Meqorot, OCLC 233403923
- Wald, Stephen (2007). "Kilayim". In Skolnik, Fred (ed.). Encyclopedia Judaica (2nd ed.). Detroit, MI.: Macmillan Reference. ISBN 978-002-865-928-2.
