= Uncovered liquids =

The concept of "Uncovered liquids" or "discovered liquids" (Mashkim Megulim) is a halachic principle according to which water, milk, or wine that has been left uncovered without human supervision is forbidden for use.

Chazal wrote that the reason for this prohibition is the concern that a snake may have drunk from them and left venom in the liquids. Therefore, these liquids are forbidden only if they were uncovered for the amount of time it would take a snake to drink from them. According to the Shulchan Aruch, this rule does not apply in modern times, as snakes are not commonly found within homes today.

== Source and interpretations ==
The source of the law is from the Mishnah in Terumot, Chapter 8, Mishnah 4:

Three liquids are forbidden due to exposure: water, wine, and milk; all other liquids are permitted. How long must they remain uncovered to be forbidden? Long enough for a creeping creature to come from a nearby place and drink.

This law is also mentioned in many places in the Talmud. The Yalkut Shimoni brings support for the prohibition of these liquids from the Midrash Yelamdenu:

Three liquids are forbidden due to exposure: water, milk, and wine. How do we know about water? From the verse, 'He spreads out the earth above the waters.' How about milk? From the verse, 'And she opened the skin of milk.' And wine? From the verse, 'All the vessels will be filled with wine.'

According to the Tosafot, the prohibition was only relevant in the Land of Israel, where snakes were prevalent, but in the cooler climates of Europe, this law need not be observed.

According to halacha, even if someone drinks an uncovered liquid and is unharmed, the remaining liquid should not be drunk. It goes on to explain that there are three types of venom: the venom of an old snake floats on the surface of the liquid, that of a medium snake penetrates halfway, and that of a young snake sinks to the bottom. Therefore, even if the first person was not harmed, the venom may have sunk in the drink, and anyone drinking afterward might be harmed.

It is also forbidden to use water that has been prohibited due to exposure for washing or cleaning, as one might be harmed by the venom. Furthermore, it is forbidden to pour it into the public domain, lest someone walk over it barefoot and be harmed. Even giving it to animals, whether one's own or someone else's, is prohibited because it could harm them (though it is explained that it is permissible to give it to a cat because venom does not kill it but only weakens it temporarily, after which it recovers).
