= Ma'aserot =

Ancient Jewish writing regarding tithes

Tractate of the Talmud
- English: Tithes
- Seder: Zeraim
- Number of mishnahs: 40
- Chapters: 5
- Babylonian Talmud pages: -
- Jerusalem Talmud pages: 26
- Tosefta chapters: 3

Ma'aserot (Hebrew: מַעֲשְׂרוֹת, lit. "Tithes") is the seventh tractate of Seder Zeraim ("Order of Seeds") of the Mishnah, Tosefta, and the Jerusalem Talmud. It discusses the types of produce liable for tithing as well as the circumstances and timing under which produce becomes obligated for tithing. In Biblical times, during each of the six years of the cycle, "Maaser Rishon" was given to Levites as 10% of an individual's crop. "Maaser Sheni" was separated in the first, second, fourth and fifth year and is 10% of the crop remaining after "Maaser Rishon". It was brought to Jerusalem to be eaten there or was redeemed upon coins which were deconsecrated upon food in Jerusalem. The final category is "Maaser Ani" that is given to the poor in the third and sixth years.

== Chapters ==
The treatise is divided into five chapters (three in the Tosefta). Its contents are summarized as follows:

Ch. 1: Whatever is edible, and is private property, and grows in the ground is subject to tithe. Plants that are edible while young as well as when full grown are subject to tithe before maturity (if any part of the crop is taken before maturity); but of plants that are not properly eatable before they reach a certain stage of ripeness one may eat, without separating the tithes, until they develop. The Mishnah then proceeds to designate the respective stages at which plants come under the general head of edibles and are consequently subject to tithe. As between picking for marketing and for domestic consumption a distinction is made: in the latter case one may use small quantities before bringing the mass under shelter.

Ch. 2-4: Under what circumstances a chaber may eat of the produce of an am ha'aretz without first separating the ma'aser. If a laborer, hired to assist in gathering figs, stipulates with his employer that he be allowed to eat of the fruit, he may eat without regard to tithing; but if his stipulation includes one of his dependents, or if he sends one of his dependents instead, the latter will not be privileged to partake of the fruit before the tithe is properly set aside. [The laborer is by law entitled to eat of the produce he handles, as a kind of charity.] After the crop reaches the employer's enclosed premises the laborer may eat thereof only if his employer has not promised to board him.

Ch. 5: Laws regarding cases in which one is required to pay tithes when he transplants vegetables; laws regarding the sale of crops to one who is suspected of non-observance; law regarding the paying of tithes in the case of vegetable fields purchased in Syria.

== Related topics in other tractates ==
Ma'aser Sheni is the main topic, along with the laws of Reva'i, of the next tractate, "Ma'aser Sheni". Maaser Ani is discussed in Tractate "Pe'ah". The seventh year of the cycle is designated "Shemitta", and in that year there were no tithes given at all in the Land of Israel.

== See also ==
- Tithes in Judaism
