= Demai =

Agricultural produce whose tithing status is uncertain

Halakhic texts relating to this article
- Mishnah: Demai
- Jerusalem Talmud: Demai

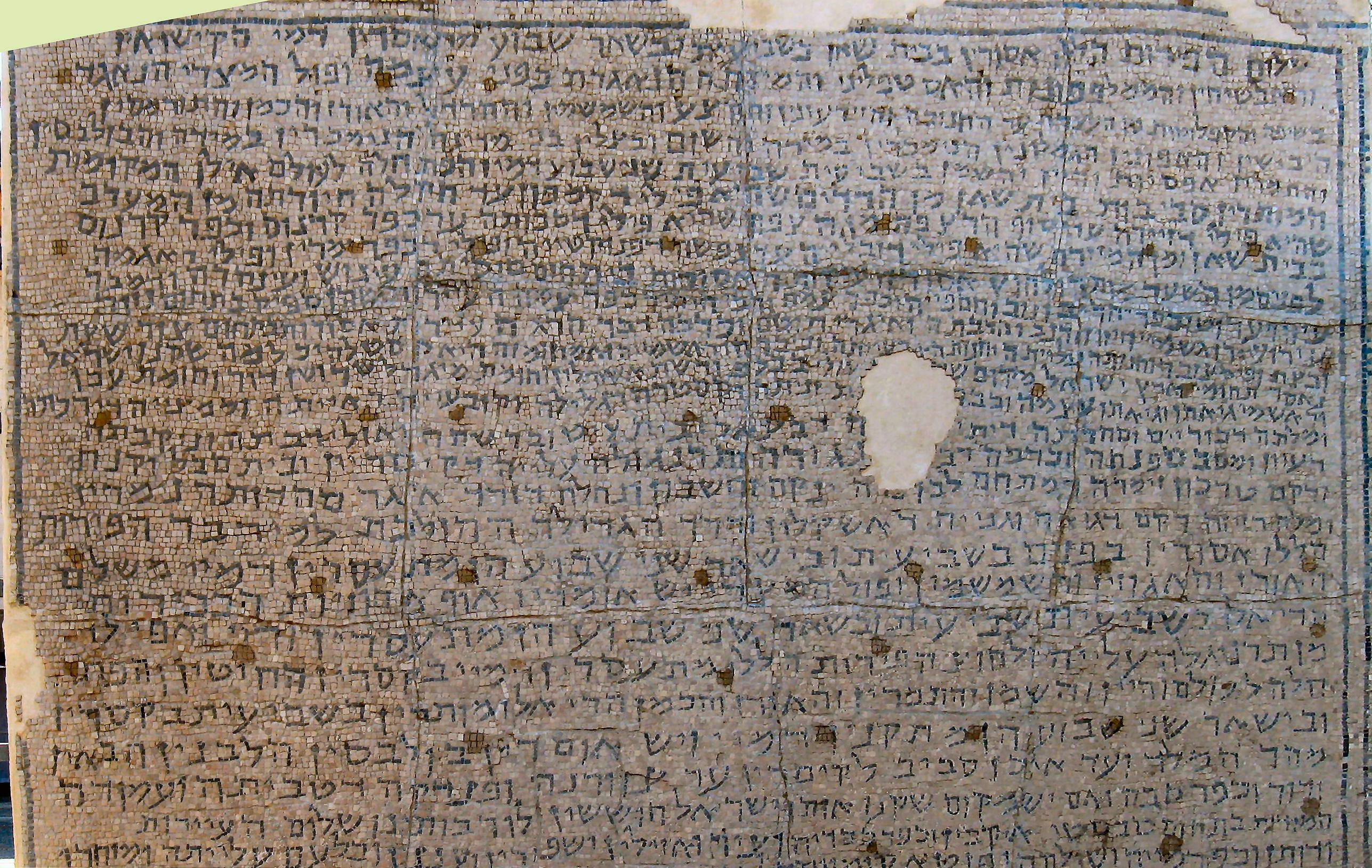
The 6th century Mosaic of Rehob is an ancient synagogal inscription delineating the agricultural tithe regions of Syria Palaestina, including regions that were automatically demai.

Demai (Mishnaic Hebrew: דמאי) is a Halakhic term meaning "doubtful". The demai status applies to agricultural produce acquired from common people (am ha'aretz) who are suspected of not correctly separating tithes according to Jewish law. As a result, one who acquires demai produce must separate some of the tithes himself, in case this was not done earlier.

== Etymology ==
The etymology of the word "demai" is uncertain, and already in the time of the Talmud may not have been known. Opinions concerning the word's etymology include:

- The Jerusalem Talmud connects it to the root d-m-y, meaning "perhaps" as in "perhaps he prepared it [the tithe], perhaps he did not prepare it." Its grammatical form may be influenced by opposite term, vadai ("certain").
- According to Maimonides, Nathan ben Jehiel, and Obadiah of Bertinoro, the word originates from a contraction of the two Aramaic words דא מאי meaning "doubtful" (literally, "what is this?").
- As a corruption of the Hebrew word דמע, "things holy", in this case referring to something which may still contain the elements of "things holy".
- From the Hebrew root דמה ("resemble"), as demai has only the appearance of properly tithed produce.
- From the Greek word δῆμος (demos, "people"), as this produce originates with the common people (am ha'aretz).

== Background ==
Jewish law requires several gifts to be separated from agricultural produce grown in the Land of Israel before it may be consumed. First, the terumah is separated and given to the Kohenim. Next, the first tithe, comprising 10% of the produce, is separated and given to Levites. The Levites must then separate 10% of their tithe (about 1% of the original produce) and provide it to priests (terumat ma'aser) according to Numbers 18:26. In addition, the original produce owner must separate a second tithe or poor man's tithe depending on the year of the shmita cycle. The second tithe must be eaten in Jerusalem or redeemed with silver to be spent on food consumed in Jerusalem, while the poor man's tithe must be given to the poor.

The two forms of terumah could only be eaten by priests, and it was a severe sin for non-priests to consume them. The second tithe could only be eaten in Jerusalem while following the laws of purity. The other tithes, for the Levites and the poor, did not have any restrictions on consumption.

== Laws of Demai ==
The rabbis divided owners of land in the Land of Israel into three classes: (1) non-Jews, to whom the Jewish laws about tithes did not apply; (2) the trustworthy Jews (ḥaverim or ne'emanim "faithful"), who reliably kept all the laws of tithing and food purity as members of an organization (ḥaverot) and (3) the ʿam haʾaretz or ordinary Jews, who were suspected of neglecting these laws. Produce bought from non-Jews was considered "unprepared," produce from which the various tithes had not been separated; that bought from trustworthy Jews was prepared; and that purchased from am ha'aretz was demai.

The rabbis did not trust the ʿam haʾaretz correctly to separate all the agricultural products. According to the rabbis, the ordinary people would reliably separate terumah gedolah for two reasons: it was not burdensome (as a minimal quantity satisfied the Law) according to Hullin 137b and the sin of neglecting it was considered very serious according to Sanhedrin 83a. However, many ordinary people would not separate the tithes, whose quantities were larger and whose punishment was less severe.

The rabbis decreed that produce acquired from the ʿam haʾaretz or common folk, known as demai, must have the terumah and first tithe separated from it in case this was not done. The second tithe was also separated.

Giving the second or poor man's tithes to Levites or the poor was unnecessary since the ʿam haʾaretz may have previously separated the tithes. Similarly, various leniencies were applied to the second tithe of demai: for example, it could be redeemed without adding one-fifth of its value.

The laws of demai only apply to produce grown in the Land of Israel and to adjacent territories immediately outside the Land of Israel, where produce grown in it was thought to have been taken.

Certain fruits were mostly exempt from tithing as demai produce because they were harvested wild, such as wild figs, jujubes (Ziziphus spina-christi), hawthorns (Crataegus azarolus), sycamore figs (Ficus sycomorus), windfall dates, capers, and, in Judea, the sumach (Rhus coriaria).

== History ==
A rabbinic tradition (cited in Mishnah Sotah, Tosefta Sotah, and the Jerusalem Talmud in Sotah and Ma'aser Sheni) indicates that the institution of demai was in force at the time of the Hasmonean High Priest Yohanan Hyrcanus (135–104 B.C.E.). On the other hand, a Baraita in the Babylonian Talmud (Sotah 48a), describes Yohanan as the person who instituted demai upon discovering that most people only separated the priestly terumah offering and neglected the tithes.
