= Alexander Harkavy =

American writer and linguist (1853–1939)

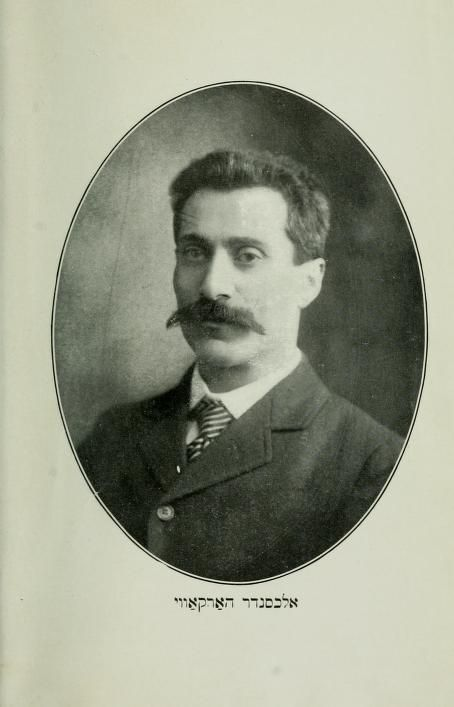
Alexander Harkavy

Alexander Harkavy (Yiddish: אַלכּסנדר האַרקאַווי; Russian: Александр Гаркави, romanized: Aleksandr Garkavi; May 5, 1863 in Novogrudok – November 2, 1939 in New York City) was a Russian-born American writer, lexicographer and linguist.

== Biography ==
Alexander Harkavy was educated privately, and at an early age evinced a predilection for philology. In 1879 he went to Vilna, where he worked in the printing-office of the Romm Brothers.

After the 1881–1882 pogroms in the Russian Empire, Harkavy joined the Jewish Am Olam back-to-the-land movement. Unlike Bilu, which directed its activities towards Palestine, Am Olam saw a Jewish future in the United States. In 1882, Harkavy emigrated to the United States but did not succeed in joining or establishing an agricultural entity, finding himself in search of a living.

Harkavy was in Paris in 1885, New York in 1886, Montreal in 1887–1889, where he married Bella Segalowska (died 1930), Baltimore in 1889 and back in New York in 1890. During these years of wandering Harkavy studied, taught, and published his first journalistic and scholarly compositions. In Montreal, he achieved some acclaim among local Hebraists and founded a branch of the Lovers of Zion, of which he served as president.

Harkavy published in lithograph form one issue of a Yiddish newspaper, Die Tzeit (The Time), the first Jewish newspaper in Canada. He also wrote the first history of the Jews in Canada. Back in the United States he participated in the activities of the anarchist group Pioneers of Liberty. In Baltimore he published Der Idisher Progres (Jewish Progress) in 1890. He was one of the contributors to the Jewish Encyclopedia.

Harkavy also worked on translating Scripture into English, starting with Genesis (published 1915), then Psalms (1915), then The Twenty-Four Books of the Holy Scriptures According to the Masoretic Text (1916), with reprintings following.

He was a representative of the Hebrew Immigrant Aid Society.

He died on November 2, 1939 in his room at the Broadway Central Hotel, after a year of ill health.

== Work on Yiddish ==
It is partly due to Harkavy's work that Yiddish today is regarded as a language. His Yiddish dictionaries show that its vocabulary is as ample as that of the average modern language, and that, if lacking in technical terms, it is richer in idiomatic and characteristic expressions.

== Works ==
Among Alexander Harkavy's most important works are:

- Alexander Harkavy, The Jews in Canada, Montreal 1887; reprinted in: Canadian Jewish Historical Society - Journal Vol. 7 no 2, S. 59-61
- "Complete English-Jewish Dictionary" (1891);
- "Dictionary of the Yiddish Language: Yiddish-English" (1898);
- pocket editions of English-Jewish and Jewish-English dictionaries;
- "Amerikanischer Briefsteller" (English and Judæo-German, 1899);
- "Ollendorf's Method of English: in Yiddish" (1893);
- "Uchebnik Angliskavo Yazyka" (1892);
- "Torat Leshon Anglit", an English grammar in Hebrew (1894);
- "Ha-Yesh Mishpaṭ Lashon li-Sefat Yehudit?" (1896), in which he shows that Yiddish has the essential elements and forms of a living language;
- "Don Kichot", a Judæo-German translation (1897–98);
- Yiddish-English (6th edition), English-Yiddish (11th edition) Dictionary (1910);
- The Holy Scriptures (1916) reprinted 1936 & 1951;
- Yiddish-English-Hebrew Dictionary (4th ed 1928) republished 1968.
- "Students' Hebrew and Chaldee Dictionary to the Old Testament" (1914)

== Bibliography of Jewish Encyclopedia ==
- E. Harkavy, Dor Yesharim, New York, 1992
- Ben-Zion Eisenstadt, Ḥakme Yisrael be-Ameriḳa, New York, 1903, p. 33
- Ha-Leom (Harkavy's autobiography), vol. ii., New York, 1903
- Kenyon Zimmer, "'The Whole World is Our Country': Immigration and Anarchism in the United States, 1885-1940" (dissertation), University of Pittsburgh 2010, p. 78-81.
- Jonathan D. Sarna, "Our Distant Brethren" - Alexander Harkavy On Montreal Jews - 1888 (engl.), in: Canadian Jewish Historical Society - Journal Vol. 7 no 2, S. 59-61

== See also ==
- YIVO
