= Isaac ben Melchizedek =

Commentator on the Mishnah (c.1090–1160)

Rabbi Isaac ben Melchizedek
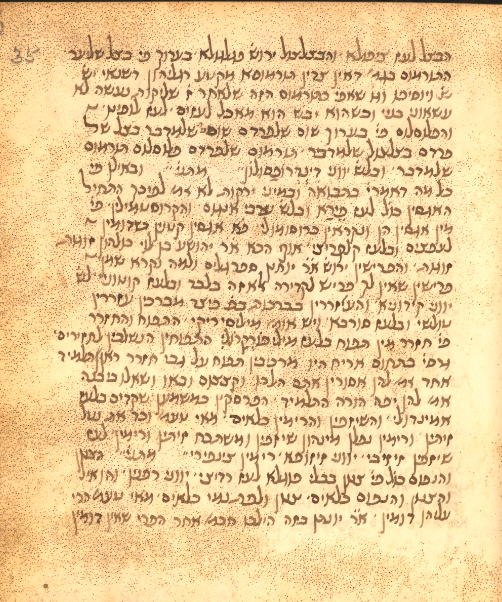
- Page from Ben Melchizedek's commentary, Kil'ayim 1:4 (Courtesy of the British Library)

Personal life
- Born: c. 1090 Siponto
- Died: c. 1160
- Occupation: Mishnaic exegete

Religious life
- Religion: Judaism
- Profession: Rabbi

Jewish leader
- Residence: Southern Italy

Isaac ben Melchizedek (Hebrew: יצחק בן מלכי צדק; also known by the acronym Ribmaṣ ריבמץ; c. 1090–1160), was a rabbinic scholar from Siponto, Italy, and one of the first medieval scholars to have composed a commentary on the Mishnah, of which only his commentary on Seder Zera'im survives. Elements of the Mishnaic order of Taharot are also cited in his name by the Tosafists, but the complete work is no longer extant.

== Background ==
Rabbi Isaac ben Melchizedek was the son of an astute Italian Jewish Talmudist. Rabbi Isaac eventually moved away from his home town and settled in Salerno. He is known to have fathered at least two sons: Judah and Shiloh. It was in Salerno that Isaac's son, Judah, met with the renowned Jewish traveler, Benjamin of Tudela. Benjamin of Tudelo referred to his father, Rabbi Isaac, as "the great rabbi." In Italy, Rabbi Isaac maintained a correspondence with Rabbi Yaakov ben Meir, known also as Rabbeinu Tam. Shiloh, his son, is mentioned in Sefer ha-'Iṭṭur.

From Naples by sea to the city of Salerno, where the Christians have a school of medicine. About 600 Jews dwell there. Among the scholars are R. Judah, son of R. Isaac, the son of Melchizedek, the great Rabbi, who came from the city of Siponto.

Isaac's Mishnah commentary is thought to have had a wide dissemination among Jewish communities throughout the Mediterranean littoral and Egypt, as some of his words are cited and argued against by great Jewish scholars in Fostat and in Posquières. Rabbi Abraham b. David of Posquières referred to Rabbi Isaac by the epithet, Ha-Rav ha-Yevani, meaning, "the Grecian rabbi," seeing that part of southern Italy was at that time under Byzantine influence. Rabbi Isaac's work is also widely cited by Solomon Sirilio where, occasionally, he decides in favor of Isaac's interpretation of a passage in the Mishnah over that of the later scholar, Maimonides. Both, Ishtori Haparchi and Rabbi Chaim Joseph David Azulai, make mention of him in their writings. Rabbi Meir of Rothenburg mentions him with respect to teachings in Mishnah Kelim 8:6; Nega'im 11:1.

Rabbi Isaac's commentary of Seder Zera'im has been printed in the 1890 Romm Wilna edition of the Babylonian Talmud. In most editions of the Berakhot tractate, his commentary on Seder Zera'im appears in its entirety. The portion of Rabbi Isaac's Mishnah commentary of Bikkurim 2:4, unto the end of the tractate, is of special importance, as it has been printed in Shimshon of Sens's commentary of the Mishnah where he left no commentary of his own. In Rabbi Isaac ben Melchizedek's commentary, besides citing from the two Talmuds, he frequently makes use of other classical rabbinic sources, such as the Tosefta, the Sifra on Leviticus, Sifrei Zuṭa on the Book of Numbers, the Aramaic Targum, the Seder 'Olam, the Sefer Arukh of Rabbi Nathan ben Jehiel of Rome, the commentary written by Rabbi Hai Gaon on the Mishnaic orders of Zera'im and Ṭaharot, as well as cites elements taken from R. Nissim's Sefer Mafteaḥ ("The book of the key to unlocking the Talmud").

== Manuscripts ==
Two manuscripts exist of Isaac ben Melchizedek's Mishnah commentary, one at the Bodleian Library in Oxford (no. 392 - [Michael 203]), written on paper and copied in the 16-17th century, containing all of Seder Zera'im; the other is housed at the British Library (Or 6712), formerly the British Museum, written on parchment and also containing all of Seder Zera'im.

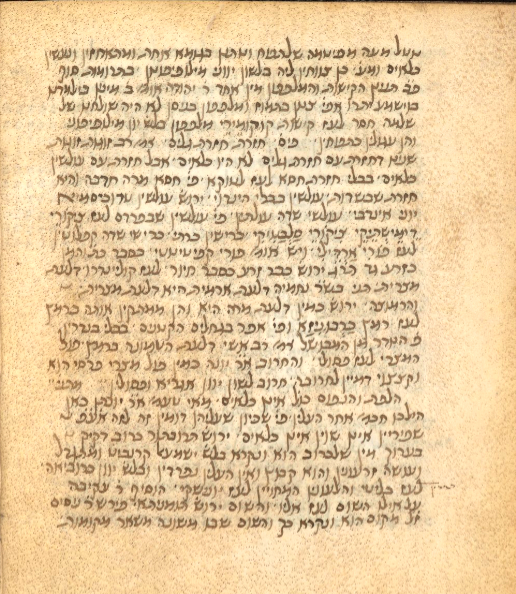
Mishnah Kil'ayim 1:2–3 (Courtesy of the British Library)

== Importance ==
Rabbi Isaac's Mishnah commentary was published and edited by Nisan Meir Zaks (q.v. N.M. Zaks) in 1975, laureate of the "Rav Kook Award" for original Torah literature. When read in conjunction with other commentaries, it is an indispensable source for helping scholars understand the diachrony of the Hebrew language, especially in its use of Greek loan words, and how that some words have changed in meaning over the course of two millennia. (Note: Solomon Sirilio (Jerusalem Talmud, Kil'ayim 1:2, s.v. קישות), citing Rabbi Isaac of Siponto, attempts to show this in the Greek loan-word "melephephon," which had the connotation of "melon." The word aspethei (Hebrew: אַסְפְּתֵי) in Mishnah Ohalot 13:4, is another disputed Greek loan word. According to R. Isaac of Siponto and R. Shimshon of Sens, the word was used for a weaver's stave; derived from the Greek word σπάθη, and being no more than the sword-like batten (beater) used in the weaver's loom for packing of the weft yarn (filling yarn). Since the batten in many cultures is a flat board of wood that is tapered to a thin edge all along its broad side, it is actually called in some countries "sword." Maimonides thought the word aspethei to mean "nail," while his disputant, Rabbi Abraham ben David, thought the same word to mean a "pair of tongs" used as an accessory to a candlestick that hung from a wall.) Rabbi Isaac's method of elucidating the Mishnah is concise, resembling that of Rashi's commentary on the Talmud. His commentary is unique in that he not only employs in his commentary Aramaic words to elucidate the text, but also Arabic, Greek, Latin and Italian words, written in Hebrew characters.
