= Challah (tractate) =

Talmudic tractate about separating dough and giving it to the priests

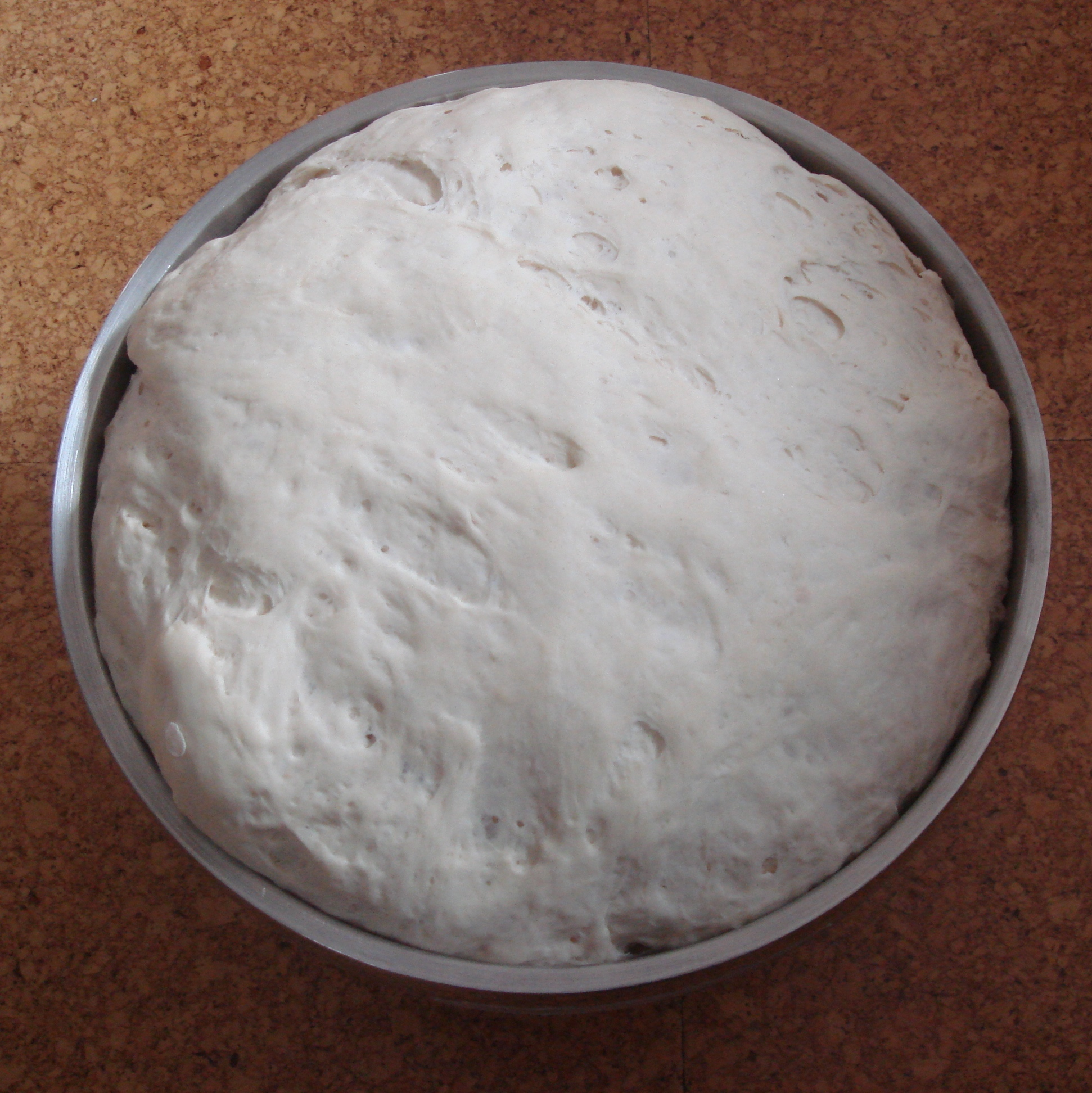
- A portion of dough was separated for the priests

Tractate of the Talmud
- English: Dough offering
- Seder: Zeraim
- Number of mishnahs: 38
- Chapters: 4
- Babylonian Talmud pages: -
- Jerusalem Talmud pages: 28
- Tosefta chapters: 2

Challah (Hebrew: חלה, romanized: ḥallah, literally "Loaf") is the ninth tractate of Seder Zeraim, the Order of Seeds. It discusses the laws of the dough offering, known in Hebrew as challah.

Like most of the tractates in Zeraim, it appears only in the Mishnah, and does not appear in the Babylonian Talmud, but rather in the Jerusalem Talmud and Tosefta only.

== The location of the tractate in Seder Zera'im ==
According to Maimonides' introduction to the Mishna, tractate Challah is arranged after the tractate of Ma'aser Sheni, "because after we take out all of these gifts – which are 'terumah' and maaser rishon and [maaser] sheni – then we grind it and make it into flour and knead it, and then we become obligated in 'challah.'"

== Contents ==
There are 38 mishnayot in tractate Challah. They are divided into four chapters as follows:

1. חֲמִשָּׁה דְּבָרִים "Five species" (Nine mishnayot) (Note: The number of mishnayot in each chapter is according to the count in Mishnayot Kehati. In other prints there may be a different division.) - what dough is required for Challah
2. פֵּרוֹת "Produce" (Eight mishnayot) - How to separate the challah.
3. אוֹכְלִין "One may snack" (ten mishnayot) - Laws of embezzlement of challah
4. שְׁתֵּי נָשִׁים "Two women" - (eleven mishnayot) - the combination of dough and the laws of giving to a priest.

== Commentaries on the tractate ==
Unlike other tractates in the order of Zeraim, a number of essays were written on the tractate Challah. This is because the mitzvah of dough offering is also practiced outside of Israel and during exile. In addition to the commentaries on the Mishnah, the Jerusalem Talmud and the Maimonides' rulings, Nachmanides wrote Halachot (like the rulings of Isaac Alfasi for the rest of the tractates), followed by Shlomo ibn Aderet and Asher ben Jehiel. A special place is given Yom Tov Algazi's commentary on the Hilchot Challah of Nachmanides.

In addition, the poskim such as the Arba'ah Turim and the Shulchan Aruch and their commentators have written about Hilchot Challah in Yoreh De'ah.

== See also ==
- Challa (disambiguation page)
