= Shatnez =

Type of cloth

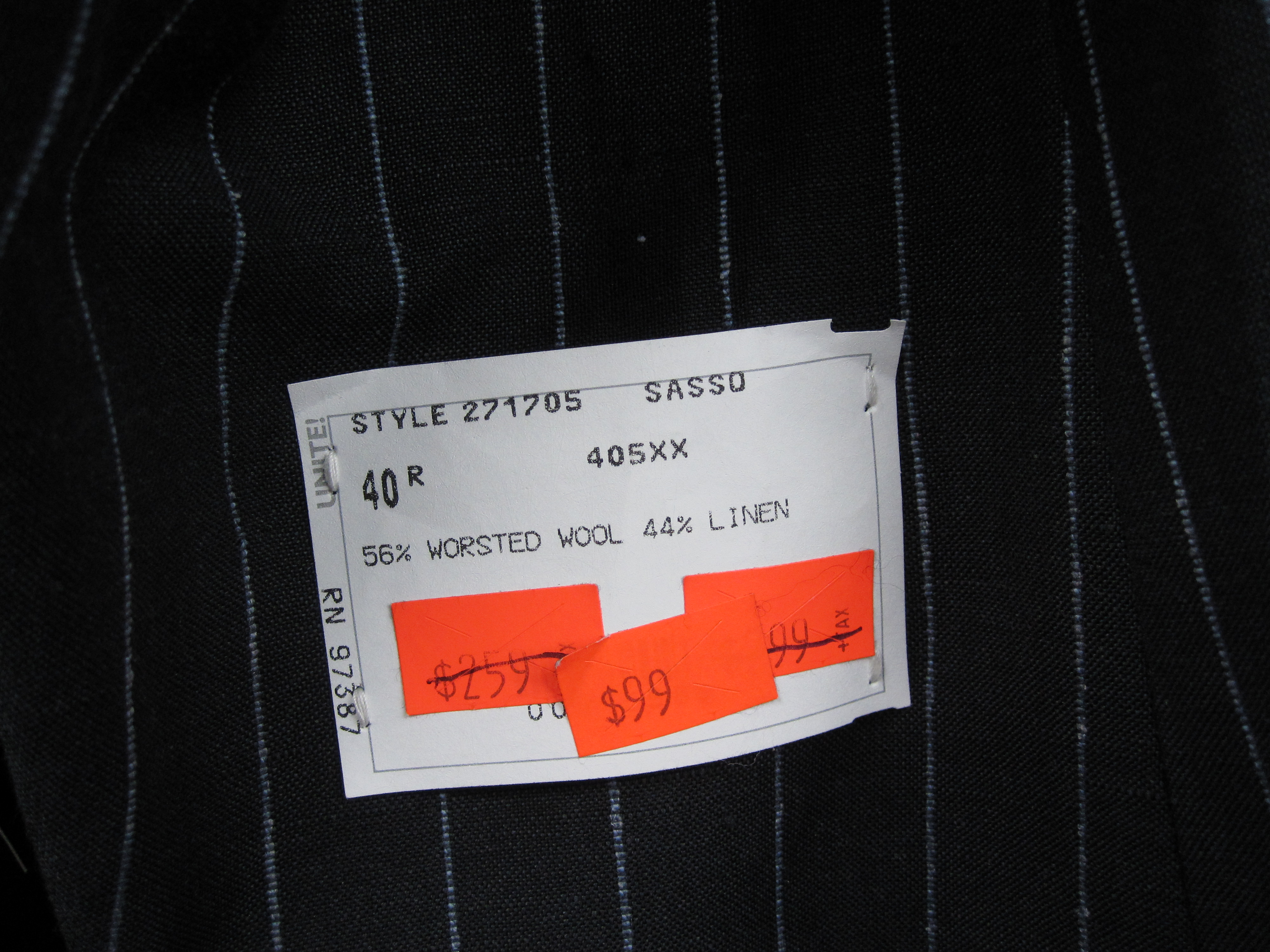
- A garment containing shatnez: 56% wool and 44% linen

Halakhic texts relating to this article
- Torah: Leviticus 19:19 and Deuteronomy 22:11
- Jerusalem Talmud: Tractate Kil'ayim (chapter 9)
- Mishneh Torah: Hilchos Kilayim 10
- Shulchan Aruch: Yoreh De'ah, 298–304

Shatnez (or shaatnez, [ʃaʕatˈnez]; Hebrew: שַׁעַטְנֵז šaʿaṭnēz) is cloth containing both wool and linen (linsey-woolsey), which Jewish law, derived from the Torah, prohibits wearing. The relevant biblical verses (Leviticus 19:19 and Deuteronomy 22:11) prohibit wearing wool and linen fabrics in one garment, the blending of different species of animals, and the planting together of different kinds of seeds (collectively known as kilayim).

== Etymology ==
The word is not of Hebrew origin, and its etymology is obscure. Wilhelm Gesenius's Hebrew Dictionary cites suggestions that derive it from Semitic origins, and others that suggest Coptic origin, finding neither convincing. The Septuagint translates the term as κίβδηλον, meaning 'adulterated'.

The Mishnah in tractate Kil'ayim (9:8), interprets the word as the acrostic of three words: שע 'combing', טוה 'spinning', and נז 'twisting'.

The Modern Hebrew word שעטנז means 'mixture'.

== Interpretation ==
Early writers, like Maimonides, state that the prohibition was a case of the general law (Leviticus 20:23) against imitating Canaanite customs. Maimonides wrote: "the heathen priests adorned themselves with garments containing vegetable and animal materials, while they held in their hand a seal of mineral. This you will find written in their books".

According to modern biblical scholars (and Josephus), the rules against these mixtures are survivals of the divide between regular clothing and clothing of the ancient Jewish temple (where these mixtures were considered to be holy and/or were forfeited to a sanctuary). Historian Kassia St. Clair compares the prohibition outside of priestly context to sumptuary laws of various times and cultures.

It may also be observed that linen is a product of a riverine agricultural economy, such as that of the Nile Valley, while wool is a product of a desert, pastoral economy, such as that of the Hebrew tribes. Mixing the two together symbolically mixes Egypt and the Hebrews. It also violates a more general aversion to the mixing of categories found in the Leviticus holiness code, as suggested by anthropologists such as Mary Douglas.

Rabbi Abraham Isaac Kook suggested a Kabbalist interpretation that as shearing wool from sheep is "intellectually ... a form of theft", morally distinct from linen, the Torah distinguishes between them to instill a sensitivity towards animal welfare for their heightened status in a future elevated universe.

== Limitations of the law ==
=== Definition of shatnez material ===
In the Torah, one is prohibited from wearing shatnez only after it has been carded, woven, and twisted, but the rabbis prohibit it if it has been subjected to any one of these operations. Hence felt made with a mixture of wool compressed together with linen is forbidden. Silk, which resembled wool, and hemp, which resembled linen, were formerly forbidden for appearance's sake, but were later permitted in combination with either wool or linen because they are now distinguishable. Hempen thread was thus manufactured and permitted for use in sewing woolen clothing.

Linen mixed with fibres produced by other animals (e.g., mohair or camel hair) is not shatnez. The character of threads spun from a mixture of sheep's wool with other fibres is determined by the majority; if only a minority of the fibre is sheep's wool it is not considered to be wool. Nonetheless, a mixture of any of these materials with linen is Rabbinically forbidden because of the prohibition on appearing as if you are breaking a religious law.

== Permitted applications ==
=== Kehuna clothing ===
Rabbinic Judaism maintains that shatnez was permitted in the case of the avnet (kohen's girdle), in which fine white linen was interwoven with purple, blue, and scarlet material. According to the rabbis, the purple, blue, and scarlet were made from wool and interwoven with the fine linen.

Karaite Judaism maintains that the purple, blue, and scarlet materials must also have been made of linen, since the Torah prohibits wearing garments made from combinations of wool and linen. The Torah does not state from what materials the purple, blue, and scarlet threads were made.

The phrase regarding the kohenim sons of Zadok, "they shall not gird themselves with any thing that causeth sweat" is interpreted in the Talmud to mean "they shall not gird themselves around the bent of the body, where sweat effuses most". Judah ha-Nasi was of the opinion that the girdle of the ordinary priest was of shatnez, but Eleazar ben Shammua says it was of fine linen. The Talmud states that the high priest wore a linen girdle on Yom Kippur and a girdle of shatnez on all other days.

=== Everyday tzitzit ===
Torah law forbids kil'ayim (shatnez) - "intertying" wool and linen together, with the two exceptions being garments of kohanim and tzizit. Concerning tzitzit, chazal permit using wool and linen strings in tandem only when genuine tekhelet is available, whereas kabbalist sources take it a step further by encouraging its practice.

=== Contact with shatnez ===
The Talmud argues that a woolen garment may be worn over a linen garment, or vice versa, but they may not be knotted or sewed together. Shatnez is prohibited only when worn as an ordinary garment, for the protection or benefit of the body, or for its warmth, but not if carried on the back as a burden or as merchandise. Felt soles with heels are also permitted, because they are stiff and do not warm the feet. In later times, rabbis liberalised the law, and, for example, permitted shatnez to be used in stiff hats.

Cushions, pillows, and tapestry with which the bare body does not touch do not come under the prohibition, and lying on shatnez is technically permitted. However, classical rabbinical commentators feared that some part of a shatnez fabric might fold over and touch part of the body; hence, they went to the extreme of declaring that even if only the lowest of 10 couch-covers is of shatnez, one may not lie on them.

== Observance and enforcement of the shatnez law ==
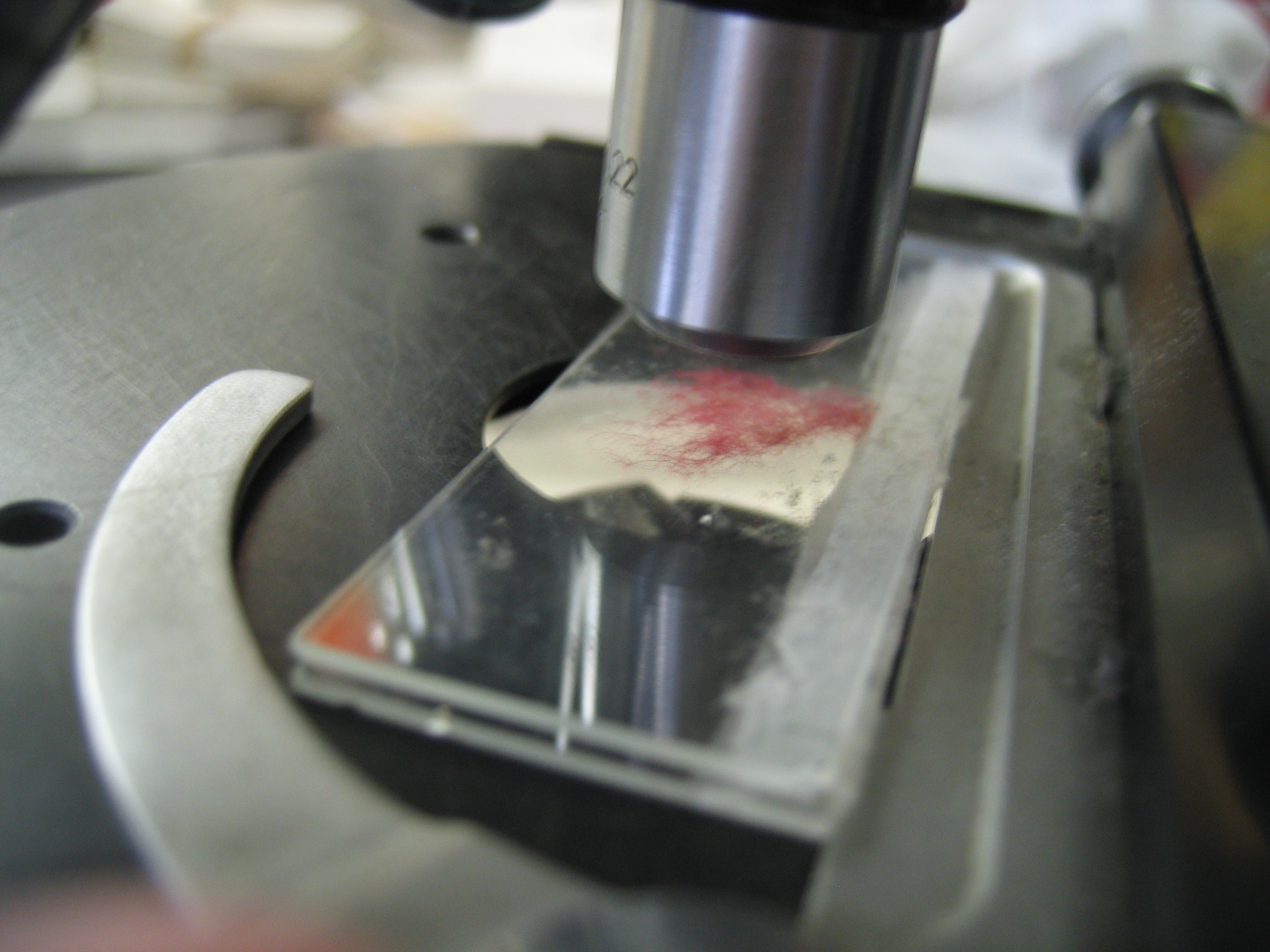
Light microscopy is performed on fabric pulled from a garment. The fabric is placed between two glass slides.

Many people bring clothing to special experts who are employed to detect the presence of shatnez. A linen admixture can be detected during the process of dyeing cloth, as wool absorbs dye more readily than linen does. Wool can be distinguished from linen by four tests—feeling, burning, tasting, and smelling; linen burns in a flame, while wool singes and creates an unpleasant odor. Linen thread has a gummy consistency if chewed, due to its pectin content; a quality only found in bast fibers.

Observance of the laws concerning shatnez became neglected in the 16th century, and the Council of Four Lands found it necessary to enact (1607) a takkanah ("decree") against shatnez, especially warning women not to sew woolen trails to linen dresses, nor to sew a velvet strip in front of the dress, as velvet had a linen back.

Observant Jews in current times also follow the laws of shatnez, and newly purchased garments are checked by experts to ensure no forbidden admixtures are used. In addition to the above-mentioned methods, modern shatnez experts employ the use of microscopy to determine textile content. In most cases, garments that do not comply can be made compliant by removing the sections containing linen. Some companies label compliant products with "shatnez-free" tags.

Modern shatnez testing examines both visible fabric and hidden structural components, including collar reinforcements, lapel canvas, shoulder pads, linings, and waistbands. Fiber-content labels generally describe only a garment's outer shell, so testers identify internal fibers by appearance, texture, and microscopy. As of 2026, about 150 testers were working in North America; many had completed a 40-hour course combining textile science, microscopy, and Jewish law.

== Karaites and shatnez ==
Karaite Jews, who do not recognize the Talmud, forbid the wearing of garments made with linen and wool (and fibres from any plant and/or any animal) under any circumstances. It is even forbidden for one to touch the other.

== Bibliography ==
- Maimonides. Mishneh Torah, Kilayim, x.;
- Ṭur Yoreh De'ah;
- Shulkhan Arukh, Yoreh De'ah, 298–304;
- Israel Lipschitz, Batte Kilayim. Appended to his commentary on the Mishnah, section Zera'im: Ha-* Maggid (1864), viii., Nos. 20, 35;
- M. M. Saler, Yalḳuṭ Yiẓḥaḳ ii. 48a, Warsaw, 1899.
- Holy Bible, New International Version®, NIV® Copyright © 1973, 1978, 1984, 2011
