= Romm publishing house =

Publisher of Jewish religious literature (1788–1941)

The Romm publishing house was a publisher of Jewish religious literature from 1788 to 1940. It is known for its 1886 Vilna Shas, which still serves as a definitive edition.

Baruch ben Yosef Romm founded the business originally in Grodno and it continued there for some decades at the same time that its primary operations moved to Vilnius in 1799. There, it expanded under the ownership of Baruch's son, Menahem Mann Romm (d. 1841), at the same time that it ceased its Grodno operation. Initially publishing halakhic and homiletic works from the misnagdic tradition, the Romms were soon caught up in the controversy between adherents of this tradition and the new movement among Eastern European Jews known as Hasidism.

== History ==
Historically, Jewish authors from Lite (the Yiddish name for a conceptual rather than historical "greater" Lithuania that has not always corresponded to the country's actual physical boundaries) had sent their manuscripts abroad, to Amsterdam, Prague, Germany, Poland, and Ukraine, for publication. The rivalry between Misnagdism and Hasidism led the former to begin publishing within Lithuania itself, specifically, in 1788, when Baruch Romm went from book dealer to book publisher.

Controversy had arisen when the Shapira family of Slavuta intended to publish a new edition of the Talmud in line with a Hasidic point of view. Rabbis on each side argued but were unable to agree as to whether rabbinical law permitted publication of this new edition. In addition, the death of a worker in the Slavuta factory led to Russian government intervention (Vilnius being at that time within the Russian Empire). The Slavuta publishing house was shut down and, to instill order among the Jewish publishers, the Russian authorities instituted a formal publishing monopoly, which Romm successfully bid for.

In 1835, located as they were in Vilnius, which was the heart of misnagdic Lite, the Romms caused a stir by publishing the Hasidic Talmud. From then until 1940 (when it was nationalized by the Soviet government), the Romms published material from the diversity of Litvak Jewish religious opinion and practice. The Romm factory burned down in 1840, but was soon rebuilt, and prospered through both its monopolistic privileges and the rapidly increasing Jewish population of the region.

When Chaim-Yankev Romm died in 1858, David Romm took over the firm. He was married to Deborah Harkavy (c. 1831 - December 1903), daughter of Rabbi Yeysef-Betsalel Harkavy of Novogrudok. The Harkavy family produced many significant scholars, including Yiddish lexicographer Alexander Harkavy (1863–1939). When David Romm died in 1862, Deborah took over management of the firm, renaming it the Widow and Brothers Romm in 1863. As The Widow Romm, she was known internationally by Hebrew and Yiddish scholars and general readers in Eastern Europe and elsewhere, giving her an unusual stature for Litvak women of her time. She was often challenged, but her good business sense along with her scrupulous attention to quality and detail kept power over the firm in her hands.

Under her direction, the firm produced a highly regarded new edition of the Talmud, completed in 1886, which is still widely used. The firm's last Talmud edition was printed in 1897, after which the rise of Zionism shifted Jewish publishing. When Deborah Romm died, the firm also started to print secular periodicals and newspapers in Yiddish and Hebrew. This was not to the liking of the person who was the manager until then, Samuel Shraga Fiignzon (שפן סופר). Deborah Romm's descendants lost interest in managing the press (with three of her sons emigrating to the United States), and the printing press got into financial difficulty. Baron David Günzburg from St. Petersburg, a scholar of Jewish affairs, came to the rescue and bought the firm in 1910. When the Baron died soon after, his widow could not continue ownership of what was by then an unprofitable printing house. The outbreak of the First World War in 1914 almost caused the firm's closure.

Thanks to the efforts of the Rabbi of St. Petersburg, Dr. Moshe Eliezer Eisenstadt, the printing house was bought by two wealthy individuals, Noah Gordon and Haim Cohen, who volunteered to rescue the printing house because of its importance. The printing house changed its name again to the Stock Company for Printing Books and Publishing "Romm". At the request of Noah Gordon, in 1920 his cousin, Mathus Rapoport, took over the management of the printing house and also became one of the owners. Rapoport ran the printing house for 20 years. On the night of July 7, 1941, just days after the German invasion of Russia, Rapoport was taken from his home at midnight and was murdered by the Nazis. With the end of the Second World War the building was confiscated by the Russians. They continued to use the printing house after the war until the beginning of the 1990s but with no connection to Judaism.

On February 4, 1990, professor Herman Branover presented the Lubavitcher Rabbi Menachem Mendel Schneerson with a Russian-language translation of the Jewish Hasidic text, the Tanya, which had been recently printed, in the quantity of 20,000 units, in the facilities of the Romm publishing house in Vilna.
