= Solomon Sirilio =

Spanish rabbi & Talmudic exegete (1485–1554)

- סיריליאו also שלמה סריליו

Personal life
- Born: 1485 Spain
- Died: 1554 (aged 68–69) Jerusalem, Ottoman Empire
- Parent: Joseph Sirilio
- Known for: Commentary on the Jerusalem Talmud (Seder Zeraim)
- Occupation: Rabbi, author

Religious life
- Religion: Judaism

Solomon Sirilio (Hebrew: סיריליאו also שלמה סריליו) (1485–1554), the son of Joseph Sirilio, was a Spanish rabbi and author of one of the first commentaries written about the Jerusalem Talmud (Seder Zeraim).

== Background ==
Solomon Sirilio was a child during the expulsion of the Jews from Spain, and wandered with his parents until they eventually reached Thessalonika in Ottoman Greece, where they settled. He studied Jewish legal law and ethics in the city's chief seats of Jewish learning, until, at length, he began to instruct others in the laws of his countrymen, the Mosaic law, both, in his city and in Adrianople. In 1532, he immigrated to Ottoman Galilee and resettled in Safed.

In Safed, he held a discussion with Jacob Berab, the chief rabbi of the city, over a decision concerning meat. Because of this dispute between himself and Berab, Sirilio left Safed and moved to Jerusalem. There he disseminated his knowledge amongst his protégés who came to learn in the college, and there he raised-up many disciples. His acclaim and renown came on account of a commentary that he wrote on the Jerusalem Talmud, covering the order known as Zeraim and the tractate Sheḳalim. His commentary was one of the first to be made on the Jerusalem Talmud, although it remained in manuscript form until 1875, when the tractate of Berakhot with Sirilio's commentary was first printed in Mayence (Mainz) by Rabbi Meir Lehmann. As late as 1950, only four Talmudic tractates with Sirilio's commentary had been published: Berakhot (Mainz, 1875); the Tractate Pe'ah in the Jerusalem Talmud edition published by the widow and brothers Romm (Vilna 1922), Terumot (Jerusalem, 1934), and Shevi'it (Jerusalem, 1935), although handwritten copies were made from the original manuscript, as shown by David Solomon Sassoon.

The entire commentary on Seder Zeraim was published (1934–1967) by Rabbi Chaim Yosef Dinkels, with another commentary of his own called Emunat Yosef, and on Tractate Shekalim (1958) by Rabbi Ephraim Ze'ev Garboz, with his commentary called Mount Ephraim. Rabbi Sirilio, in his introduction to the tractate Berakhot, writes that he was inspired to write a commentary on Seder Zeraim after seeing an old commentary written in the glosses of the Jerusalem Talmud (Seder Moed), made by one of the rabbis in his native Salonika. In his own words, "I saw... that these tractates (Seder Zeraim of the Jerusalem Talmud) have no commentary at all, while even the Gemaras themselves are not to be found accurate, but all of them are full of corruptions. Moreover, I have not found in my generation a wise man who is skilled in the Jerusalem Talmud." Sirilio's manner of elucidation excels in lucidity and is largely built upon Rashi's commentary. Like Rashi, Sirilio will often explain the etymology of difficult Hebrew words (e.g. קרוסטמלין in Ma'aserot 1:3 and Kila'im 1:4, and חמיטה in Ma'aserot 1:4, etc.)

Some of the earlier sources cited by Sirilio in his commentary are Samson ben Abraham of Sens and Moses Maimonides, and he will often make use of transliterated Spanish words to explain the meaning of difficult Hebrew words. Occasionally, Sirilio relies on the commentary of Rabbi Isaac ben Melchizedek of Siponto (c. 1090–1160) over that of Maimonides' commentary in Seder Zera'im. In Sirilio's introduction to Tractate Berakhot (part ii), he expounds upon the unique style of the Jerusalem Talmud, explaining its peculiar usage of Aramaic words used in the Land of Israel, as opposed to Babylonia, and which have never been elucidated in the Arukh.

Many of his contemporaries, in their own written responsa, including Rabbi Yosef Karo's Beit Yosef, have cited his interpretation, regarding it as being authoritative. After the death of the chief rabbi of Jerusalem, Rabbi Levi ibn Habib (ha-Ralbach), Rabbi Sirilio became the leading sage of the Jewish community of Jerusalem, until his own death a few years later.

== Legacy ==
A copy of Rabbi Solomon Sirilio's commentary on the Jerusalem Talmud is now stored in the British Museum, which had been purchased by Yehudah Zeraḥya Azulai from his heirs. A different manuscript of Sirilio's commentary is the Moscow Ms., excerpts of which were used in the Oz Vehodor edition, in addition with the British Museum Ms. The Oz Vehodor edition (and the Artscroll edition, which uses the Oz Vehodor layout) of the Jerusalem Talmud in Hebrew now have the commentary on the whole of Seder Zeraim. He also compiled a Gemara to the Mishnah of the treatise 'Eduyot', by gathering the passages scattered in the Talmud and adding a commentary of his own.
