= Zeraim =

First Order of the Mishnah and Talmud

Seder Zeraim (Hebrew: סדר זרעים, romanized: Sēder Zərāʿim, lit. "Order of Seeds") is the first of the six orders, or major divisions, of the Mishnah, Tosefta, and the Talmud, and, apart from the first tractate which concerns the rules for prayers and blessings, primarily deals with the laws of agricultural produce and tithes of the Torah which apply in the Land of Israel, in both their religious and social aspects.

== Topics ==
Zeraim deals principally with the religious and social aspects of the agricultural laws of the Torah. It explains and elaborates upon the Torah commandments regarding to the rights of the poor and of the Kohens and Levites to the produce of the harvest, as well as the rules and regulations concerning the cultivation and sowing of fields, gardens and orchards. These laws are dealt with in eleven tractates, each of which concerns a separate aspect of the general subject for which this Order is named. The first tractate, Berakhot, concerns the daily prayers and blessings that observant Jews are obligated to recite.

One explanation for the inclusion of the tractate Berakhot, whose topic is seemingly quite different from the remainder of the tractates of the Order is given in the Talmud itself (Shabbat 31a), by Shimon ben Lakish, who homiletically states that the first of the six terms in a verse in Isaiah (Isa 33:6) – the word emunah "faith" corresponds to Seder Zeraim. This designation is seen as addressing how regulations regarding prayers and blessings – and especially those concerning the recital of the Shema Yisrael – the emblematic Jewish declaration of faith in the One God – came to be grouped with agricultural laws, which are seen both as an expression of faith through reliance on God and, according to Rashi, the foremost Talmudic commentator (1040–1105 CE), as an expression of faithfulness in social relationships, by providing their respective dues to the poor and the Kohens and Levites as described in the other tractates of this Order.

== Content ==
Seder Zeraim comprises eleven tractates, with a total of 74 chapters, as follows:

- Berakhot "Blessings", consists of nine chapters and deals with the rules for daily prayer, particularly the Shema and the Amidah, and other blessings and prayers said before and after eating, and on other occasions.
- Pe'ah ("Corner"), has eight chapters and deals with the commandments concerning the gifts to the poor from the produce of the land, namely from the corners of the field which must be left to the poor, gleanings, and forgotten produce assigned to them, as specified in the Torah Lev 19:9–10, Lev 23:22 and (Deut 24:19–22), and with the topic of charity and rights of the poor in general.
- Demai ("Doubtfully Tithed Produce"), has seven chapters and deals with cases in which it is uncertain that tithes have been set aside from produce for the Kohanim (priests) and Levites.
- Kil'ayim ("Mixed Species"), has nine chapters and deals with rules regarding forbidden mixtures in agriculture, clothing and animal breeding, as specified in Leviticus 19:19 and Deuteronomy 22:9–11.
- Shevi'it ("Seventh Year") has ten chapters which deal with the agricultural and fiscal regulations concerning the Sabbatical Year, and the remission of debts, as specified in Exodus 23:11, Leviticus 25:1–8 and Deuteronomy 15:1–11
- Terumot ("Donations") comprises eleven chapters dealing with the laws regarding the terumah donation given to the Kohanim, as specified in Numbers 18:8–20, Deuteronomy 18:4.
- Ma'aserot ("Tithes") has five chapters concerning the rules regarding when produce is subject to the various tithes.
- Ma'aser Sheni ("Second Tithe"), comprising five chapters, deals with the rules concerning the tithe or its equivalent which was to be eaten in Jerusalem in the first, second, fourth and sixth years of the seven-year agricultural cycle culminating in the Sabbatical Year and as mandated by the Torah, as stated in Deuteronomy 14:22–26.
- Hallah ("Dough") comprises four chapters that deal with the laws regarding the offering of dough to be given to the Kohanim as specified in Numbers 15:18–21.
- Orlah ("First Fruits of Trees") with three chapters deals chiefly with the prohibitions on the use of a tree for the first three years after it has been planted, as specified in Leviticus 19:23–25 and the requirements regarding the fruit of the fourth year.
- Bikkurim ("First Fruits") has three chapters with the laws concerning the first-fruit gifts to the Kohanim and the Temple and a description of the donation ceremony, as specified in Exodus 23:19 and Deuteronomy 26:1.

== Structure ==
Zeraim is the first seder (order or division) of the Mishnah, in accordance with the traditional order specified by Rabbi Shimon ben Lakish in the Talmud (Shabbat 31a), although Rabbi Tanhuma suggests in the Midrash (Bamidbar Rabbah 13:15–16) that another tradition has Zeraim as the second order of the Mishnah.

Seder Zeraim differs from the general pattern of the other orders that the tractates are arranged in descending order of the number of chapters and, in fact, according to an early tradition, Shevi’it and Kil'ayim come between Terumot and Ma'aserot. There is also evidence that Demai was placed between Kilayim and Ma'aserot.

In many editions of the Mishnah, even early ones like those of Naples (1492), and of Riva (1559), as well as in most of the editions of the Babylonian Talmud, a fourth chapter, which is likely a Baraita, has been added to Bikkurim. The sequence of the volumes of Zeraim in both editions (as above) corresponds with that given by Maimonides.

== Talmud ==
Zeraim was compiled and edited between 200–220 CE by Rabbi Yehudah haNasi and his colleagues, as part of the Mishnah, the first major composition of Jewish law and ethics based on the Oral Torah. Subsequent generations produced a series of commentaries and deliberations relating to the Mishnah, known as the Gemara. These together with the Mishnah compose the Talmud: one produced in the Land of Israel c. 300–350 CE (the Jerusalem Talmud); and a second, more extensive Talmud compiled in Babylonia and published c. 450–500 CE (the Babylonian Talmud).

For Zeraim, in the Babylonian Talmud, there is Gemara – rabbinical commentary and analysis – only for tractate Berakhot. In the Jerusalem Talmud there is a Gemara for all the tractates of Zeraim, as the laws with which they deal mostly concern the Land of Israel, where this Talmud was compiled and these laws were applicable.
