= Pe'ah =

Tractate of the Talmud about gifts to the poor

Tractate of the Talmud
- English: Corner (of the field)
- Seder: Zeraim
- Number of mishnahs: 69
- Chapters: 8
- Babylonian Talmud pages: -
- Jerusalem Talmud pages: 37
- Tosefta chapters: 4

Pe'ah (Hebrew: פֵּאָה, lit. "Corner") is the second tractate of Seder Zeraim ("Order of Seeds") of the Mishnah and of the Talmud. This tractate begins the discussion of topics related to agriculture, the main focus of this seder (order) of the Mishnah. The tractate discusses the laws of gifts to the poor when a person harvests their field, vineyards or trees, based on commandments in the Torah. The tractate also deals with the laws of giving charity in general. The tractate is called Pe'ah because the first part of the tractate deals with the laws of Pe'ah, while the remaining part of the tractate deals with a number of other related topics.

In addition to the Mishnah, a tractate Pe'ah exists in the Jerusalem Talmud (commenting on the Mishnah tractate), but not in the Babylonian Talmud.

== Topics ==
This tractate discusses the gifts due to the poor when fields, vineyards or trees are harvested, and the laws of giving charity in general. Six categories of obligations are discussed in the tractate, as follows:

1. Pe'ah: "corner" - the portion of the crop that must be left standing for the poor, in accordance with Lev. 19:9 and Lev. 23:22
2. "Leket": "gleanings" - ears of grain that fell from the reaper's hand or the sickle while the grain is being gathered during the harvest, as described in Lev. 19:9 and Lev. 23:22)
3. "Shich'chah": "forgotten sheaves" - sheaves left and forgotten in the field while the harvest is being brought to the threshing floor, as well as attached produce overlooked by the harvesters, as in Deut. 24:19
4. "Olelot" - immature clusters of grapes, as in Lev. 19:10 and Deut. 24:21
5. "Peret" - grapes that fall from their clusters while being plucked from the vine, as in Lev. 19:10
6. "Ma'aser ani" - the tithe for the poor, every third and sixth year of the tithing cycle, as in Deut. 14:28–29 and Deut. 26:12–13

There are three gifts to the poor from the field: Pe'ah, Leket and Shich'chah; four gifts from the vineyard: Pe'ah, Shich'chah, Peret, and Olelot; and two from the trees: Pe'ah and Shich'chah. These gifts apply every year. In addition, in the third and sixth year of the Shmita cycle, a person is required to set aside the ma'aser ani (tithe for the poor).

== Structure and content ==
The tractate consists of eight chapters and has a Gemara (rabbinical analysis of and commentary on the Mishnah) only in the Jerusalem Talmud.

Chapters 1-4 deal with the obligation of Pe'ah. The end of chapter 4 and most of chapter 5 concern the laws of leket; the end of chapter 5 to the beginning of chapter 7 deals with the laws of shechicha. Chapters 7 and 8 discuss the laws of peret and olelot, followed by the laws of ma'aser ani and tzedakah (charity).

Chapter eight discusses the laws of eligibility and entitlement to public charity, including tithes and agricultural gifts. It relates that Jewish communities maintained two kinds of charitable organizations: tamchuy and kuppah. One was for travelers, who were to be provided food and lodgings, including extra meals for the Sabbath. The other was the charity fund for the local poor. Both institutions were required to provide minimum quantities to the poor from funds collected by the local community.

Of general interest are the first and last mishnayot in the tractate:

The first mishna of tractate Pe'ah declares that there is no maximum limit to pe'ah (one can give as much of the produce in one's field to the poor as one desires once the harvest has begun), bikkurim (the first-fruits), the pilgrimage, acts of lovingkindness, and Torah study. After exhorting people to give their all to God and other people, the mishnah states that a person receives a reward in this world and in the next by honoring his father and mother, doing acts of lovingkindness, making peace between people, and that the study of Torah is equivalent to them all.

Likewise, the concluding mishnah is a compilation of ethical homilies warning people against feigning poverty, improperly taking from charity and perverting justice. On the other hand, it lauds the poor person, who is eligible to be supported by charity, yet refuses public funds, working hard and living frugally. To such a person, the verse "Blessed is the man who trusts in the Lord; and the Lord will be his trust" (Jer. 17:7) applies.

== Liturgical uses ==
These are things for which there is no fixed measure: the corner of the field, first fruits, appearance before the Lord [on festivals with offerings], acts of kindness, and the study of Torah.

— Mishnah Peah 1:1, recited in the daily morning prayers

The morning service in both the Ashkenazi and Sefardi liturgy begins with recital of blessings over the Torah, followed by brief selections from the Hebrew Bible, Mishna and Gemara, in accordance with a statement in the Talmud (Kiddushin 30a) that Torah learning comprises these three elements. The biblical text is the three verses of the Priestly Blessing, the Mishna is the first one from this tractate (Peah 1:1), about commandments that have no fixed measures, (including the mitzvah of Peah, and of learning Torah), and a passage from the Gemara (Shabbat 127a) about the reward for good deeds in this world and the next.
