= Vilna Edition Shas =

Printed edition of the Talmud

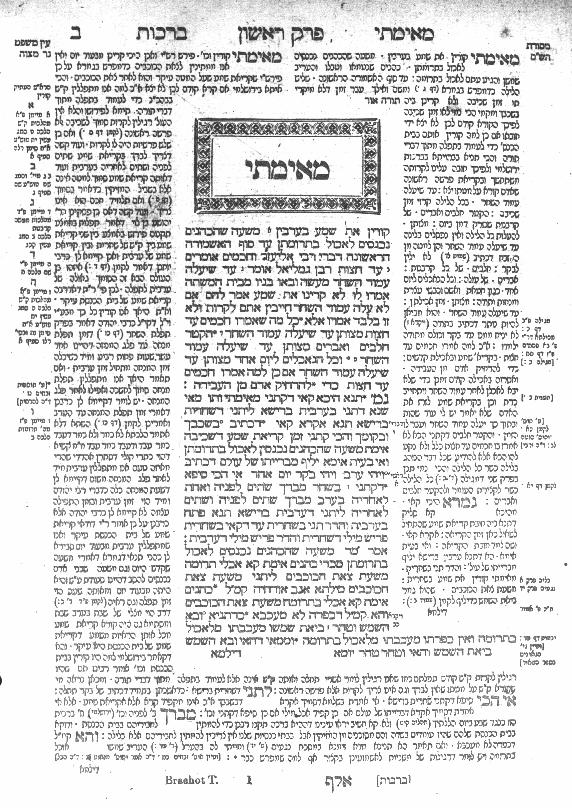
The first page of the Vilna Edition of the Babylonian Talmud, Tractate Berachot, folio 2a.

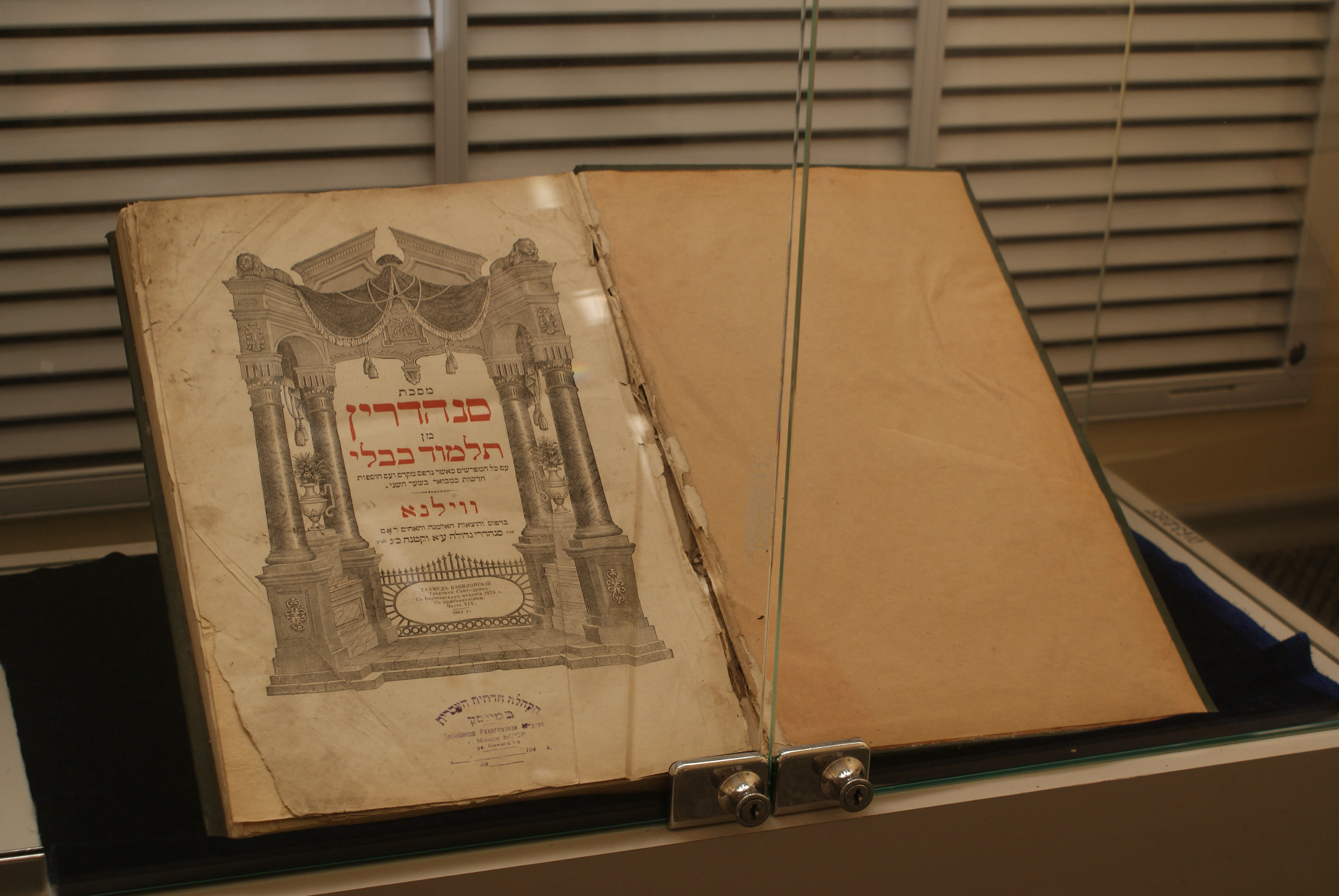
Early printing of Tractate Sanhedrin, originally belonging to a synagogue in Bobruisk

The Vilna Edition of the Talmud, printed in Vilna (now Vilnius), Lithuania, is by far the most common printed edition of the Talmud still in use today as the basic text for Torah study in yeshivas and by all scholars of Judaism.

It was typeset by the Widow Romm and Brothers of Vilna. This edition comprises 25 volumes (small tractates are combined) and contains the entire Babylonian Talmud. In its entirety, there are 2,711 double-sided folio pages. It follows the typical pagination of Bomberg printing with the Gemara and/or Mishnah centered with Rashi's commentary on the inner margin and Tosafot on the outer margin. It is also flanked by other various marginal notations from various prominent Talmudists. This edition was first printed in the 1870s and 1880s, but it continues to be reproduced photomechanically worldwide.

== History ==
Plans for publication of the Vilna Shas were announced in 1834 by the owners of the Vilna-Horadna Press, Menachem Man Ream and Simcha Zimmel. Along with a copyright, a restriction was placed on publishing another Shas for twenty years.

=== Copyright Accusations ===
A rival edition of the Talmud, the Slavuta Shas, had been published almost three decades earlier, in 1807. The publishers of the Slavuta Talmud argued that the Vilna Edition infringed on their rabbinical court-ordered 25-year license to be the sole publishers of the text. Although more than 25 years had passed since the date of the first edition of the Slavuta Shas, only 21 years had passed after its latest edition.
