= Elijah of Fulda =

Elijah ben Judah Loeb of Fulda (Hebrew: אליהו מפולדה; 1650s in Vyzhnytsia – c. 1720 in Fulda) was the earliest and most important of the early Ashkenazic commentators on the previously neglected Jerusalem Talmud.

His commentaries on the Jerusalem Talmud were the Mahara Fulda and its companion, Tosefot Maharaf. These were published in Amsterdam in 1710 (though not in their entirety). Many subsequent commentators refer to him simply as HaMefaresh (The Commentator). The addenda printed at the end of various early editions of this commentary have been consolidated in glosses called He'arot Maharaf.

Elijah ben Judah Loeb lived in Wiznica for most of his life, only settling in Fulda in his later years. His division of his commentary into two parts—Commentary and Novellae—was the model for David ben Naphtali Fränkel's division into two parts of his Korban ha-Edah "The Communal Sacrifice." His Korban ha-Edah (or Qorban Ha'edah) was published posthumously in Dessau in 1743.
