= Ma'aser Sheni =

Ancient Jewish writing regarding tithes

Tractate of the Talmud
- English: Second tithe
- Seder: Zeraim
- Number of mishnahs: 57
- Chapters: 5
- Babylonian Talmud pages: -
- Jerusalem Talmud pages: 28
- Tosefta chapters: 5

Ma'aser Sheni (Hebrew: מעשר שני, lit. "Second Tithe") is the eighth tractate of Seder Zeraim ("Order of Seeds") of the Mishnah and of the Talmud. It concerns the second tithe obligation as well as the laws of Revai.
