= Laws and customs of the Land of Israel in Judaism =

Biblical laws relating to the Land of Israel

Laws and customs of the Land of Israel in Judaism are those Jewish laws that apply only to the Land of Israel. These include the commandments dependent on the Land (Hebrew: מצוות התלויות בארץ; translit. Mitzvot Ha'teluyot Be'aretz), as well as various customs.

== Classification ==
According to a standard view, 26 of the 613 mitzvot apply only in the Land of Israel. Overall, the laws and customs may be classified as follows:

- Laws that were in force at the time of the Temple in Jerusalem and in connection with the Temple service. These relate to the Paschal lamb during the Passover festival, the bringing of the First Fruits to Jerusalem, the tri-annual pilgrimage to Jerusalem; the test applied to the wife suspected of faithlessness ("sotah"); all the sacrifices, and the priestly Levitical services.
- Laws in connection with Jewish civil and military government, as those relating to the king, to covenants with foreign countries, to taking the census, and to military affairs.
- Laws concerning the produce of the land: the heave-offering for the priests; the tithes to the Levites; the poor man's right to the gleanings, the forgotten sheaf, and the unreaped grain in the corners of the field; the use of young trees (prohibited during the first three years); the mixing of different kinds of vegetables (kil'ayim); the Sabbatical year.
- Health laws: the quarantine regulations; the defilement and purification of persons, dwellings, and garments, and their examination by a qualified priest.
- Laws connected with the functions of the Sanhedrin in the Jewish state: Ordination; Sanctification of the New Moon and the arrangement of the calendar; the laws of the Jubilee and the blowing of the shofar on Yom Kippur to announce the Jubilee; the laws of Jewish servants; the right to sell a thief should he fail to make restitution for his theft; the regulations for the cities of refuge; corporal punishments and fines (capital punishment ceased seventy years prior to the destruction of the Second Temple, owing to the encroachments of the Roman rule, which began to assert its influence in Judea). Moreover, it is unlawful for the people of Israel to engage in either a mandatory war or a voluntary war, except when the nation of Israel is dwelling in its promised homeland, the Land of Israel.

=== Priestly gifts ===
- Bikkurim (First-fruits)
- Separation of dough-portion (ḥallah)
- Terumah (separated by Israel and given to the priests of Aaron's lineage)
- First tithe (separated by Israel and given to the Levites)
- Terumat hamaaser (separated by Levites and given to the priests of Aaron's lineage)

=== Poor man's gifts ===
- Gleanings (leḳeṭ)
- Forgotten sheaves (shiḫḥah)
- Unharvested corners (pe'ah)
- Fallen grapes (pereṭ)
- Clusters of grapes that are poorly formed (ʻolelot)
- Poor man's tithe (ma'aser ʻanī) – separated by Israel from produce and given to the poor twice in a seven-year cycle

=== Sanctity ascribed to the Land of Israel ===
- Prohibitions of diverse kinds (kila'ei zeraʻim)
- Prohibition of eating the new grain crop until after the first-day of Passover (ḥadash)
- Three-year abstinence from eating fruit of young trees, until tree has entered its fourth year (ʻorlah)
- Fourth-year tree plantings, fruits of which eaten in Jerusalem (netaʻ revaʻī), or redeemed before they can be eaten in the Land of Israel
- Second tithe, eaten by Israel within the walls of Jerusalem (maʻaser shenī)
- Sabbatical Year, not only includes the cessation of labour in the fields, but laws governing aftergrowths, and biur (shmiṭa)
- Jubilee (yovel) – Yovel means that every 50 years the land goes back to original owners give them an opportunity to start over and get the chance to turn their life around (Leviticus, 25). "A jubilee shall that fiftieth year be unto you; ye shall not sow, neither reap that which growth of itself in it, nor gather the grapes in it of the undressed vines. For it is a jubilee; it shall be holy unto you; ye shall eat the increase thereof out of the field. In this year of jubilee ye shall return every man unto his possession. And if thou sell aught unto thy neighbor, or buy of thy neighbor's hand, ye shall not wrong one another. According to the number of years after the jubilee thou shalt buy of thy neighbor, and according unto the number of years of the crops he shall sell unto thee." Leviticus: Chapter 25

== Rabbinical distinctions ==
The Rabbis distinguish between those laws that must be upheld in the land and which are dependent upon the boundaries of the country at the time of the return of Jews from the Babylonian captivity (Hebrew: עולי בבל) (for a delineation of its border, see Mosaic of Rehob), as opposed to a set of different laws which apply to the country that extends beyond the one just named, and which was settled in its entirety by the people who departed Egypt in the days of Moses (Hebrew: עולי מצרים). The laws pertaining to the Seventh Year apply only to that territory formerly occupied by Jews who returned from the Babylonian captivity in the days of Ezra.

After the destruction of Jerusalem, some the special laws of the Land of Israel became obsolete according to a strict interpretation of Mosaic law, while others remain in full-force as at the time of the Temple. However, the Rabbis, desiring to maintain a distinction between the Land of Israel and the rest of the world, and for other reasons stated below, kept in force some of the special laws. These are recognized as "derabbanan" (by virtue of the Rabbis) in contradistinction to "de-Oraita" (by virtue of the Mosaic law).

Those of the laws of the Land of Israel that were extended after the Exile were originally enacted for the purpose of protecting the judicial administration and economic interests of the Land, and with a view to encourage settlement there. Hence semikhah was still left in the hands of the judiciary, with power to inflict the penalties of lashes and fines, and to announce the day of the new moon on the evidence of witnesses. (See Hebrew calendar.) But the power of the Sanhedrin was of short duration in consequence of incessant persecution, which drove the Talmudists to Babylon. The fixed calendar was then accepted everywhere, yet there still remained the difference between the Land of Israel and the rest of the world as to the observance of the second day of holidays.

During the time of the Second Temple, it was forbidden to partake of the new grain harvest until after the offering of the Omer (the first barley harvest on the night of the 16th of the lunar month Nisan). Rabban Johanan ben Zakkai, after the destruction, made it prohibited to partake of the new harvest until the 17th day of the lunar month Nisan, leaving the original time in perpetual abeyance. The prohibition of eating the new grain harvest until the 17th day of Nisan applies to, both, the Land of Israel and to places outside of it, and is observed with respect to cultivated barley, wheat, spelt, wild barley and oats.

If a gentile living in the land claimed to have been converted to Judaism his claim was valid; but the same claim made by a gentile living abroad was accepted only when corroborated by witnesses.

Similarly, a divorce signed by witnesses in the Land of Israel was valid on prima facie evidence; but such a writ abroad was not valid unless verified by the oral testimony of the signing witnesses before the rabbinate, that "it was written and signed in our presence".

== Agricultural restrictions ==
The Rabbis prohibited the exportation of provisions which are necessaries of life, such as fruits, wines, oils, and firewood, and ordered that these provisions should be sold directly to the consumer in order to save to the purchaser the middleman's profit. Another ordinance was directed against the raising of small livestock (sheep and goats) except in woods or barren territory, in order to preserve the cultivated lands from injury.

To secure an adequate supply of slaves, the Mosaic law providing for the freedom of a slave who had fled from his master (Deut. 23:15) was made applicable to a slave escaping from other lands, but not to a slave escaping from the land.

== Settlement in the Land of Israel ==
For the benefit of settlers it was decreed that the owner of a town in the Land must leave a public thoroughfare on all four sides of the town, and that a Jew about to purchase real property from a gentile in the Land of Israel may have the contract drawn up on Sabbath to facilitate and bind the bargain, though such a proceeding is prohibited in other lands.

Residence in the Land of Israel is regarded as becoming immediately permanent. For example, a rented dwelling outside Israel need not have a mezuzah during the first thirty days, as the tenancy is considered temporary for the first month; but in Israel the posting of the mezuzah is immediately obligatory.

The regulation of migration to and from the land had in view the object of maintaining the settlement of the Land. One must not emigrate unless the necessaries of life reach the price of a "sela" (two common shekels) for a double se'ah-measure of wheat, and unless they are difficult to obtain even then. A person may compel his or her spouse, under pain of divorce, to go with them and settle in the land, which is not true for any other travel.

== Customs ==
Besides these legal variations there were many differences, especially in the early periods, between Jewish practices in the Land of Israel and Babylon (sometimes called "the East"). The differences are fifty in number according to one authority, and fifty-five according to another, where some were done only in the Land of Israel. The most important ones are as follows :

- The fast-day after Purim in memory of the persecution of the Jews in Alexandria by the Greek general Nicanor prior to his defeat by the Maccabeans was observed in the Land only.
- The Torah reading cycle, which in the Land of Israel was completed in three or three and one-half years, was elsewhere completed in one year, on Simchat Torah.
- One of the congregation was honored in being permitted to take the scroll from the Ark, and another was similarly honored in being permitted to return it to its place ("hotza'ah" and "hakhnasah"): elsewhere it was considered an honor only to restore the scroll to the Ark.
- Seven persons constituted minyan for kaddish and blessings: elsewhere no less than ten persons were required.
- The Sabbath was announced every Friday afternoon by three blasts on the shofar: this was not done elsewhere.
- In the Land of Israel no one touched money on the Sabbath: elsewhere one might even carry money on that day. Jews who are strictly shomer shabbos will not carry anything except, for this one condition, permitted items for which the eruv allows.
- The nuptial ceremony was distinguished by the sanctification of the ring given by the groom to the bride. In Babylon the ring "was not in sight" (this phrase is ambiguous, and some interpret it as meaning that the presentation of the ring occurred not in public at the synagogue, but in private [see "Sha'are Ẓedeḳ," responsum No. 12]).
- The law that a widow should not be permitted to marry within twenty-four months after her husband's death if when he died she had a nursing child, for fear she might commit infanticide, was enforced even if the child died within that period; in Babylon she was permitted to marry within that time if the child died.
- Mourning was observed for any infant: in Babylon, not unless it was older than thirty days.
- A student was permitted to greet his teacher with "Peace to thee, master": in Babylon, only when the pupil was first recognized by his teacher.

Another difference between the Jerusalem and the Babylonian schools was in the degrees of confidence shown in supernatural remedies and charms; these occur much less frequently in the Jerusalem Talmud than in the Babylonian. In particular, those in the Land of Israel did not believe in the apprehension of danger from the occurrence of even numbers, known as "zugot".

== See also ==
- Mosaic of Rehob
- Impurity of the land of the nations
- Yom tov sheni shel galuyot
- From Dan to Beersheba
