= Tithes in Judaism =

Religious donations in Judaism

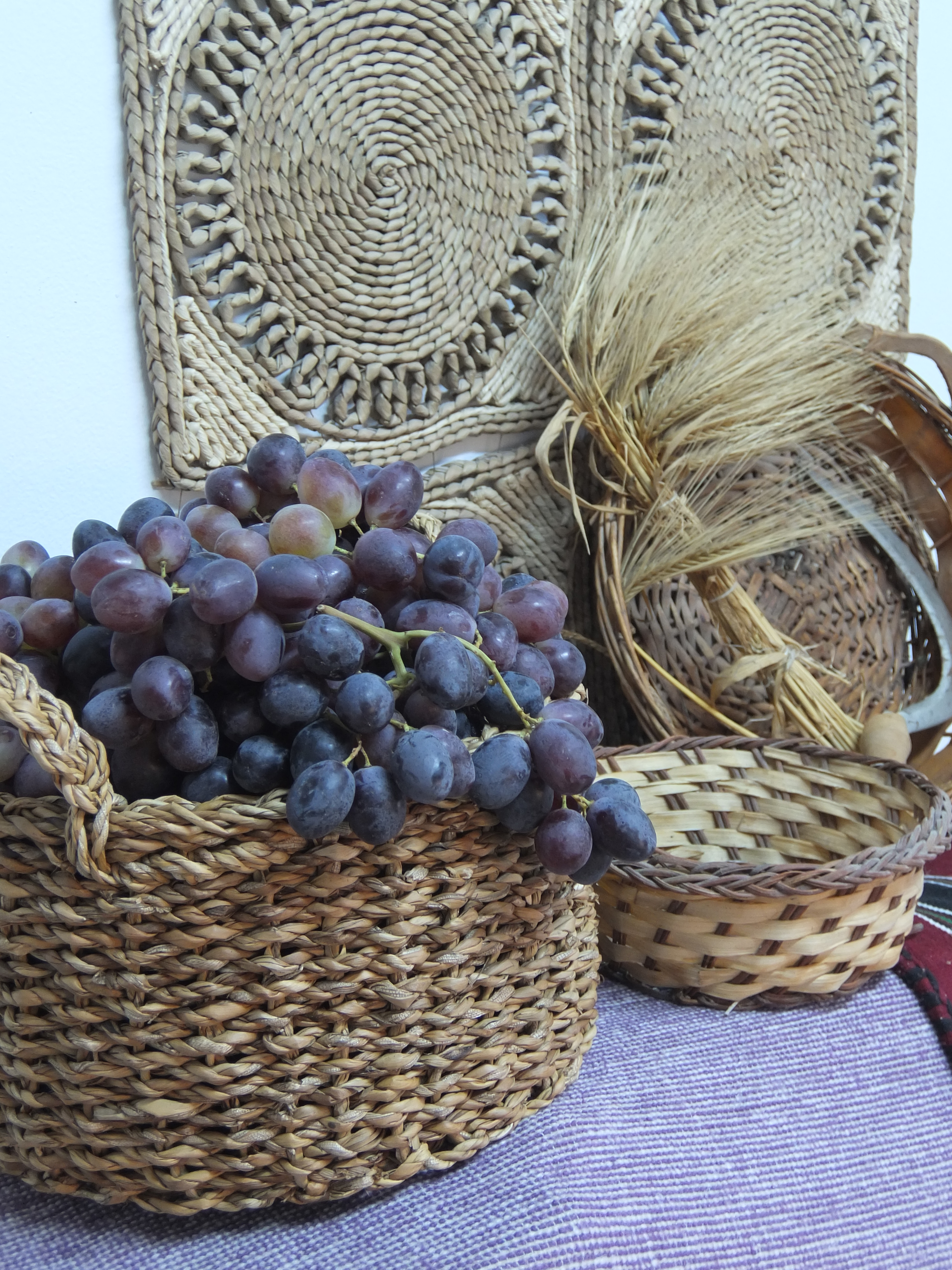
Harvested grapes in basket and reaped barley

The tithe (Hebrew: מעשר; ma'aser) is specifically mentioned in the Books of Leviticus, Numbers and Deuteronomy. The tithe system was organized in a seven-year cycle, the seventh-year corresponding to the Shemittah-cycle in which year tithes were broken-off, and in every third and sixth-year of this cycle the second tithe replaced with the poor man's tithe. These tithes were akin to taxes for the people of Israel and were mandatory, not optional giving. This tithe was distributed locally "within thy gates" to support the Levites and assist the poor. Every year, Bikkurim, terumah, ma'aser rishon and terumat ma'aser were separated from the grain, wine and oil. Initially, the commandment to separate tithes from one's produce only applied when the entire nation of Israel had settled in the Land of Israel. The returnees from the Babylonian exile who had resettled the country were a Jewish minority, and who, although they were not obligated to tithe their produce, put themselves under a voluntary bind to do so, and which practice became obligatory upon all.

The first record of tithing in the Torah appears in Genesis 14:20, where Abraham gave "a tenth of everything" to Melchizedek.

== When the obligation starts ==
The obligation of separating the respected portions and giving them to the designated parties (priests, Levites and Israelites) applies to six years out of the seven-year cycle. With respect to the Second Tithe, it was permitted to redeem their value in money for a later time when the owner is able to buy therewith fruits in Jerusalem and to eat them there, within the walls of the city. Fruits and vegetables are exempt from tithing during the Seventh Year, but during the other six years, the obligation to tithe begins with the ripening of most fruits and when they are brought within the owner's house.

Under certain conditions, some harvested fruit and grain can still be eaten temporarily, without tithing. For example, if grapes were intended to be eaten fresh, their ripening determines when they must be tithed. If, however, the owner intends to make wine from the grapes, the fresh grapes can still be eaten without tithing, until such time that the owner has pressed the grapes and he removes the stems, peels and seeds from the wine cask, in which case it signals its final preparation (גמר מלאכה), when the wine must be tithed. Figs require tithing when they become ripe, but if the owner intends to make fig-cakes from them, they can be eaten fresh without tithing until such time that he either smooths out the surface of the fig-cake that lays within its round mold, in which case the obligation to tithe them begins. Most fruits from trees (excluding olives) can be tithed the moment the fruit begins to ripen on the tree (Hebrew: חנטה). Grain and olives become liable to tithes when they have reached at least 1/3 of their potential growth. After harvesting, wheat is tithed once the grain has been separated from the husks and has been gathered together into a heap by the winnowing fork, or put within a granary. Until then, the grain may be temporarily eaten without tithing. If one tithed grain, he must still separate the Challah dough-portion, when baking a quantity of bread. Vegetables require tithing by a rabbinic decree when they are picked.

If oil were to be pressed from the harvested olives, one may still temporarily make use of the oil that collects in the lower millstone and within the frails without tithing. Oil, however, that falls into the vat requires tithing before it can be consumed.

== Terumah (Heave-offering) ==
This offering is sometimes called the priestly dues, as it is intended for the priests of Aaron's lineage. The first obligation that was incumbent upon an Israelite or Jew was to separate from his harvested grain, such as wheat, barley, or spelt, wine (including unpressed grapes) and oil (including unpressed olives) the one-fiftieth portion of these products (or one-fortieth, if he were a man of generosity; and one-sixtieth if he were stingy) and to give the same to a Kohen, a priest of Aaron's lineage, who, in turn, would eat such fruits in a state of ritual cleanness, in accordance with a biblical command, "...and let him not eat of the holy things, until he bathes his flesh in water. And when the sun goes down, he will be clean, and shall afterward eat of the holy things because it is his food".

The tractate Terumot of the Mishnah and of the Jerusalem Talmud formulates the Jewish religious law for this gift, specifying two kinds of terumot given to the priest: the regular offering, known also as the terumah gedolah ("great heave-offering"), which the Israelites were required to give to the priest from the produce of their fields, and the terumat ma'aser ("tithe of the heave-offering"), the gift that the Levites were required to put aside for the priests from the tithe which ordinary Israelites had been required to give to them.

This obligation was contingent upon the fact that such fruits grew in the Land of Israel. Later, the Rabbis made it an obligation to do the same for all fruits and vegetables grown in the Land of Israel, and not only to such fruits as grain, grapes and olives.

After the destruction of the Temple and the cessation of ritual purity, the obligation to separate the terumah continued, although it was no longer given to a kohen, since the requirements for attaining ritual purity were no longer available. The general practice after the Temple's destruction was to separate the terumah from all fruits and vegetables by removing even a small amount, and to immediately discard it by burial or some other means of disposal (since it can no longer be eaten in the current state of ritual uncleanness, and those doing so would make themselves liable to extirpation).

== First tithe ==
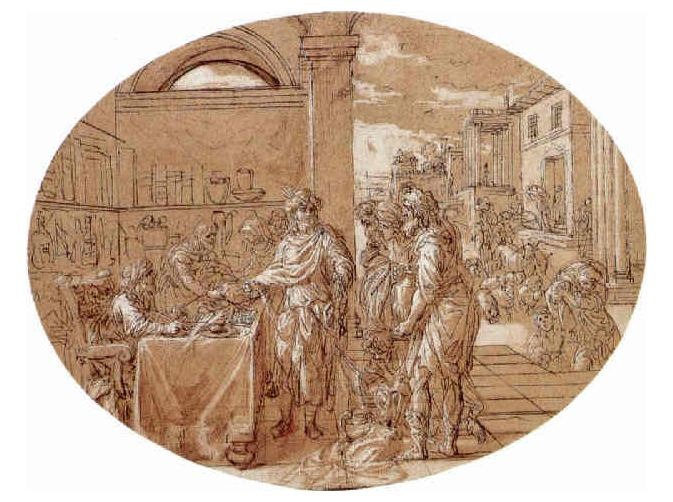
Tithing in the Temple by Pierre Monier

The first tithe is the gift of one tenth of the remaining agricultural produce to the Levite after removing from the produce for gift of terumah to the priests). Historically, during the First Temple period, the first tithe was given to the Levites. Approximately at the beginning of the Second Temple construction, Ezra and his Beth din implemented giving it to the kohanim.

The Levites, also known as the Tribe of Levi, were descendants of Levi. They were assistants to the Aaronic priests (who were the children of Aaron and, therefore, a subset of the Tribe of Levi) and did not own or inherit a territorial patrimony. Their function in society was that of temple functionaries, teachers and trusted civil servants who supervised the weights and scales and witnessed agreements. The goods donated from the other Israelite tribes were their source of sustenance. They received from "all Israel" a tithe of food or livestock for support, and in turn would set aside a tenth portion of that tithe (known as the terumat hamaaser) for the priests.

The tractate Ma'aserot of the Mishna and of the Jerusalem Talmud formulates the Jewish religious law for the types of produce liable for tithing, as well as the circumstances and timing under which produce becomes obligated for tithing during each of the six years of the tithing cycle.

== Second tithe ==
Unlike other offerings which were restricted to consumption within the tabernacle, the second tithe could be consumed anywhere within the Walls of Jerusalem. On years one, two, four and five of the Shemittah-cycle, God commanded the Children of Israel to take a second tithe that was to be brought to the place of the Temple. The owner of the produce was to separate and bring 1/10 of his finished produce to the Old City of Jerusalem, after separating terumah and the first tithe, but if the family lived too far from Jerusalem, the tithe could be redeemed upon coins. Then, the Bible required the owner of the redeemed coins to spend the tithe "to buy whatever you like: cattle, sheep, wine or other fermented drink, or anything you wish". Implicit in the commandment was an obligation to spend the coins on items meant for human consumption.

Today, with the absence of the Temple and ritual purity, the second tithe is no longer consumed in Jerusalem. Rather, the designated second tithe of fruits and vegetables is "redeemed" on a piece of money, and the money discarded. Second tithe produce valued at one-hundred denarii can be redeemed on a perutah, and does not require redeeming its full monetary value. The second tithe then becomes no more than common produce, without any sanctity, and may be consumed by all.

== Poor man's tithe ==
The poor man's tithe, also referred to as the pauper's tithe or the third tithe, is a triennial tithe of one's produce, required in Jewish law. It requires that one tenth of produce grown in the third and sixth years of the seven-year sabbatical cycle be given to the Levites and the poor.

The law applies during the days of the Temple in Jerusalem, and after the Temple's destruction. It applies only to crops that are harvested in the Land of Israel, but during the seventh year, also applies to crops harvested in Jordan and Egypt, so that the poor of Israel would be supported in the seventh year.

== Terumat maaser ==
Terumat hamaaser was given by the Levite to the Kohen, and was one-tenth of what the Levite had received of the first-tithe. It is alluded to in the Hebrew Bible under the words, "a tithe (tenth) of the tithe". It, too, was considered terumah, and was eaten by priests in a state of ritual cleanness. Today, the terumat maaser is discarded because of general uncleanness, just as the terumah is now discarded.

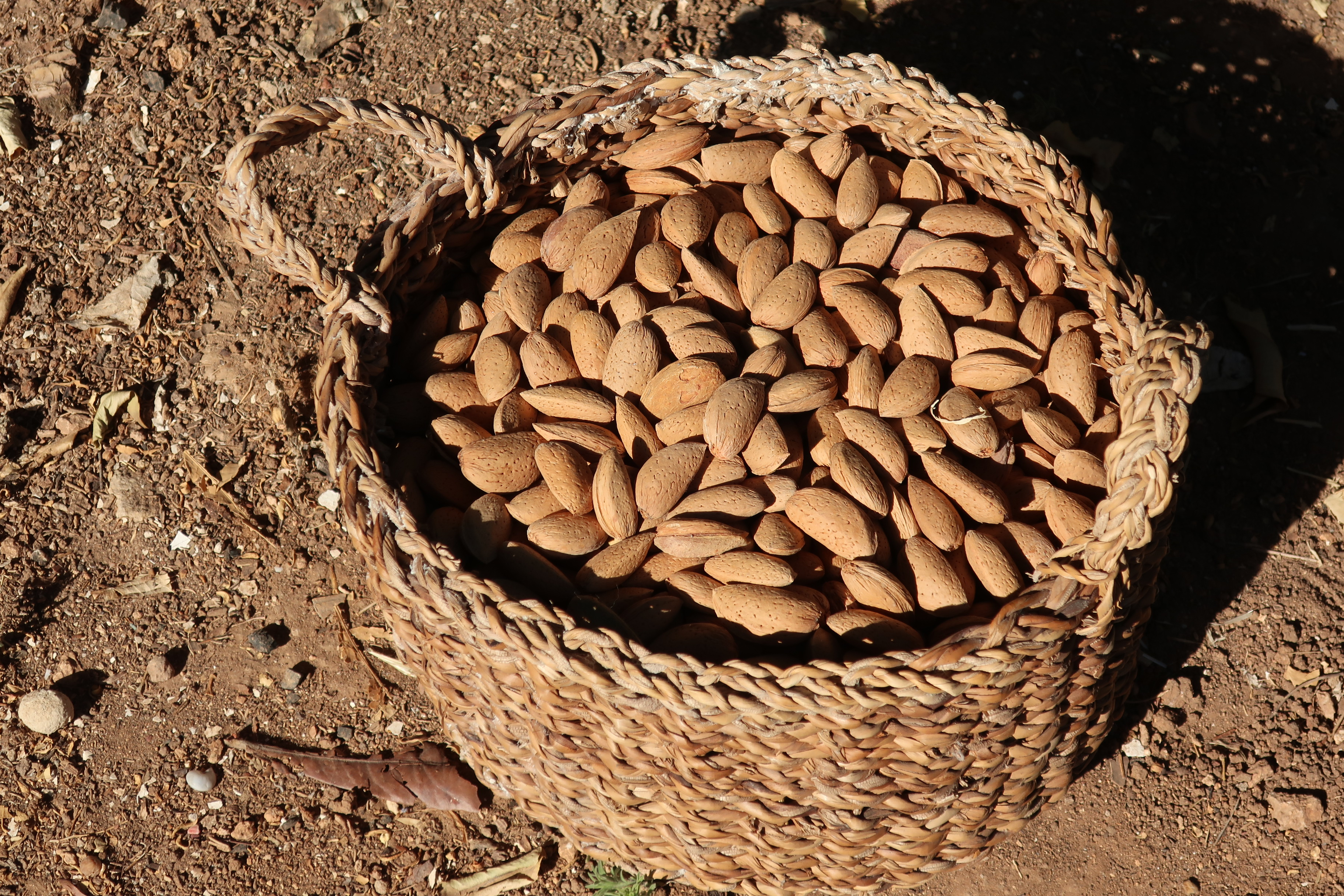
Autumnal fruits

== Demai ==
Demai (Mishnaic Hebrew: דמאי) is a halakhic term meaning "dubious", referring to agricultural produce, the owner of which was not trusted with regard to the correct separation of the tithes assigned to the Levites, although the terumah (the part designated to priests) was believed to have been separated from such fruits. In such "dubious" cases, all that was necessary was to separate the one-tenth portion due to the priests from the first tithe given to the Levites, being the 1/100 part of the whole. The second tithe is also removed (redeemed) from the fruit in such cases of doubt.

== Places that require tithing ==
The criterion for determining what places require the tithing of produce is any place within the country that was held by the Returnees from the Babylonian exile, as defined in the "Baraita of the Boundaries" of the Land of Israel; although today the land might be held by a different entity, or else worked by non-Jews, produce grown in those places would still require the separation of tithes when they come into the hand of an Israelite or Jew who completed their preparation process (גמר מלאכה) before being sent to the market.

Tithes are broken-off during the sabbatical year (such as when the ground lies fallow), during which year, all fruits, grains and vegetables that are grown of themselves in that year are considered free and ownerless property. For example, whatever lands were held by those returning from the Babylonian exile at the time of Ezra are forbidden to be ploughed and sown by any Jew during the seventh year, and even if gentiles were to plough such land and sow it, the produce would be forbidden unto Jews to eat. On the other hand, the extension of such lands held by the people of Israel who departed Egypt and who entered the Land of Canaan under their leader, Joshua, are forbidden to be ploughed by any Jew during the seventh year, but if gentiles had ploughed such land and sown it, the produce is permitted to be eaten by a Jew. If on a regular week-year, fruits and grains and vegetables, if grown by an Israelite in these places, would require tithing.

=== Special exemptions ===
Some fruits and vegetables are exempt from tithing altogether, such as when a gentile grew a crop on land that he purchased or owned in Israel, and made all necessary "final preparations" (גמר מלאכה) for the selling of such produce in the marketplace. Had an Israelite come along and purchased the produce from him, it is exempt from tithing. However, if an Israelite purchased fruits and vegetables from the gentile that were grown on the gentile's property, yet before the gentile could make "final preparations" for their selling in the marketplace, the Israelite who purchased the produce made all necessary final preparations himself (such as by pressing the grapes to make wine and removing from the wine casks the grape stems, peels and seeds), the produce would require tithing. Although the Israelite, in this case, is required to separate all tithes from such produce, he is not required to give to a Levite the First tithe, but may retain it himself, seeing that the produce belonged originally to a gentile who was not bound to give of his produce as a tithe to any man of the Hebrew nation.

== Cattle tithe ==
An additional tithe mentioned in the Book of Leviticus is the cattle tithe, which is to be sacrificed as a korban at the Temple in Jerusalem.

== Ma'aser kesafim ==
Ma'aser kesafim is a tithe that Jews give to charity (tzedakah), something that is done on a voluntary basis, as this practice has not been regulated in Jewish codes of law.
