= Bikkurim (tractate) =

Tractate of the Talmud dealing with the offering of first fruits

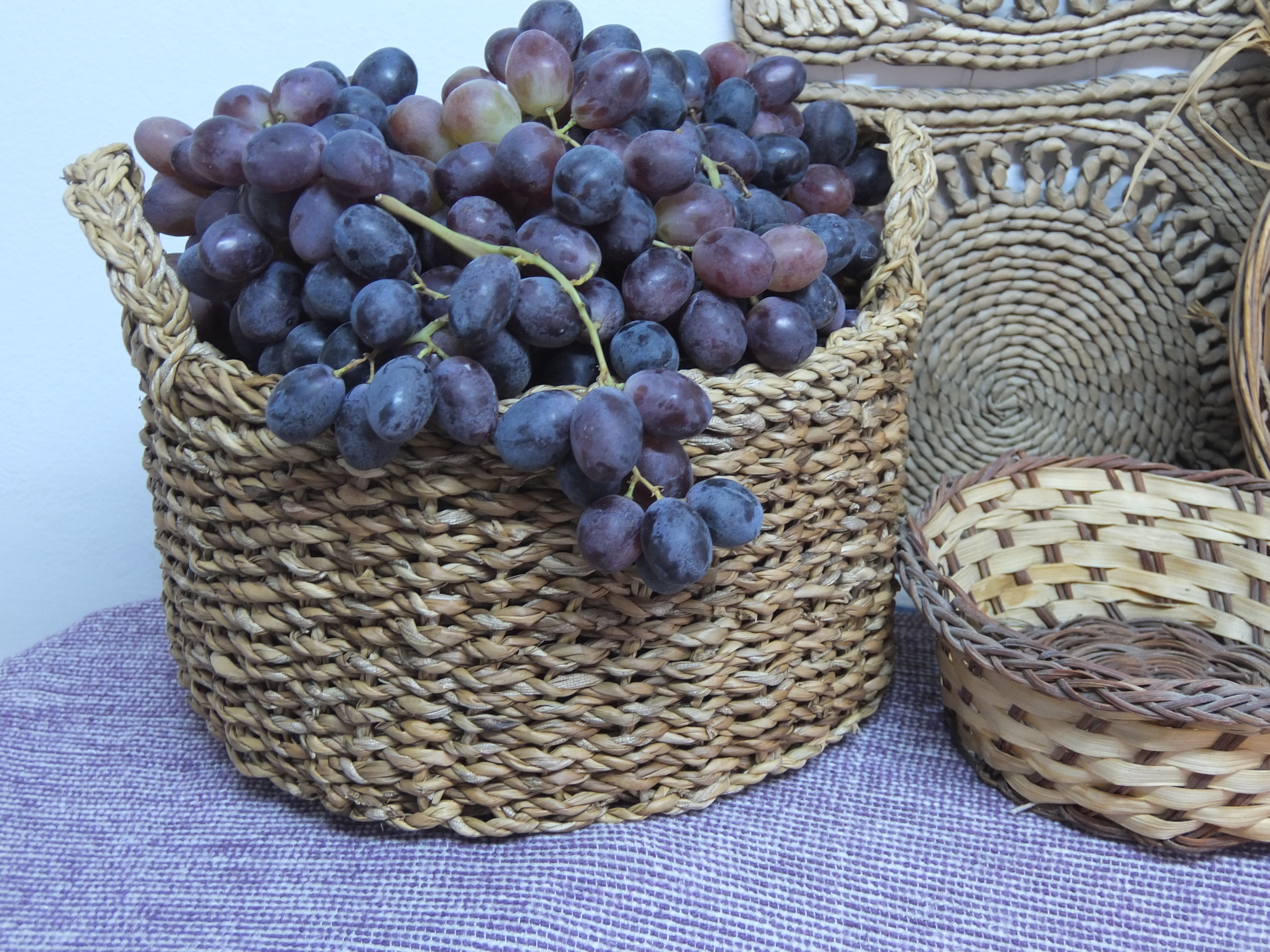
- Offerings of first fruits were brought in baskets

Tractate of the Talmud
- English: First fruit
- Seder: Zeraim
- Number of mishnahs: 39
- Chapters: 3
- Babylonian Talmud pages: -
- Jerusalem Talmud pages: 13
- Tosefta chapters: 2

Bikkurim (Hebrew: ביכורים, lit. "First-fruits") is the eleventh tractate of Seder Zeraim ("Order of Seeds") of the Mishnah and of the Talmud. All versions of the Mishnah contain the first three chapters, and some versions contain a fourth. The three chapters found in all versions primarily discuss the commandment (found in Deuteronomy 26:1–11) to bring the Bikkurim (first fruits) to the Temple in Jerusalem and to make a declaration upon bringing it. As is common in the Mishnah, related matters are also discussed.

== Contents ==
The first chapter discusses who has the responsibility to bring the first fruits and make the declaration, who needs to bring the first fruits but not make the declaration, and who can not bring the first fruits. Among those who bring the first fruits but don't make the declaration are converts, so other halakha regarding differences between the obligations of converts and those born Jewish are also discussed here. This difference for converts was disagreed with by Rabbi Judah bar Ilai and later Maimonides, and it is their position that has become the practice of the Jewish community.

In the second chapter, a comparison (as to legal classification) is made between the terumah, ma'aser (the second tithe, which had to be brought to Jerusalem and consumed there) and bikkurim, and makes other legal comparisons between citron, trees, and vegetables; between the blood of human beings and that of cattle and creeping things; and between beast, cattle, and "koy" (Hebrew: כּוֹי), an intermediate between cattle and beast. The third chapter describes more fully the process of bringing the first fruits to the Temple at the festival of Shavuot.

The fourth chapter, which is only sometimes included, originates from the Tosefta Bikkurim. It compares the laws relating to men, women, and those of intermediate sex, including the tumtum (one with no genitalia) and the androgynos.

There is no Gemara in the Babylonian Talmud. The Jerusalem Talmud has Gemara on Bikkurim, in which the laws of the Mishnah are discussed in the usual way, with a few digressions, noteworthy among which is that on Leviticus 19:32 "You shall rise before a venerable person and you shall respect the elderly," and on the value of the title "zaken" (elder) conferred on scholars in the Land of Israel and outside the Land (Yerushalmi 3:3, 11a-b or 65c).
