= Terumah (disambiguation) =

Terumah is a Hebrew word, originally meaning lifted apart, but meaning donation in modern Hebrew. It can refer to:

- Terumah (offering), a type of sacrifice in the Hebrew Bible
- Terumat hamaaser, a tithing obligation arising from the Terumah sacrifice still regarded as obligatory by Orthodox Judaism on produce
- Terumot, the plural of Terumah, and a section of the Mishnah concerning tithing obligations
- Terumah (parsha), the nineteenth weekly portion of the Torah. It primarily contains the instructions on how to create the Tabernacle
