= Animal tithe =

Jewish commandment in the Torah

Halakhic texts relating to this article
- Torah: Leviticus 27:32–33
- Mishnah: Bekhorot, Chapter 9
- Babylonian Talmud: Bekhorot, Chapter 9
- Mishneh Torah: Sefer Korbanot, Bechorot, Perek 6

The animal tithe (Hebrew: מַעְשַׂר בְּהֵמָה, "Ma'sar Behemah") is a commandment in the Torah requiring the sanctifying a tithe of kosher grazing animals (cattle, sheep, and goats) to God, to be sacrificed as a Korban at the Temple in Jerusalem.

The tithe of animals was not redeemable; and if one animal was exchanged for another both became sanctified. The method of levying the tithe of animals is indicated: they were counted singly; and every tenth one that passed under the rod became the tithe animal.

The Tannaim inferred from Deuteronomy 14:22 that each tithe was to be taken of every year's produce separately, whether of crops, of cattle, or of anything else subject to tithing. Also they fixed a particular day to mark the beginning of the year for tithing. The new year's day for the tithing of animals (Rosh Hashanah L'Ma'sar Behemah) is the first of Elul according to Rabbi Meir, or the first of Tishrei according to Rabbi Eleazar and Rabbi Simeon.

The Sages ordained that animals should not be tithed in the present era when the Temple is not standing.

== See also ==
- First tithe
- Poor tithe
- Second tithe
