= Tene (Judaism) =

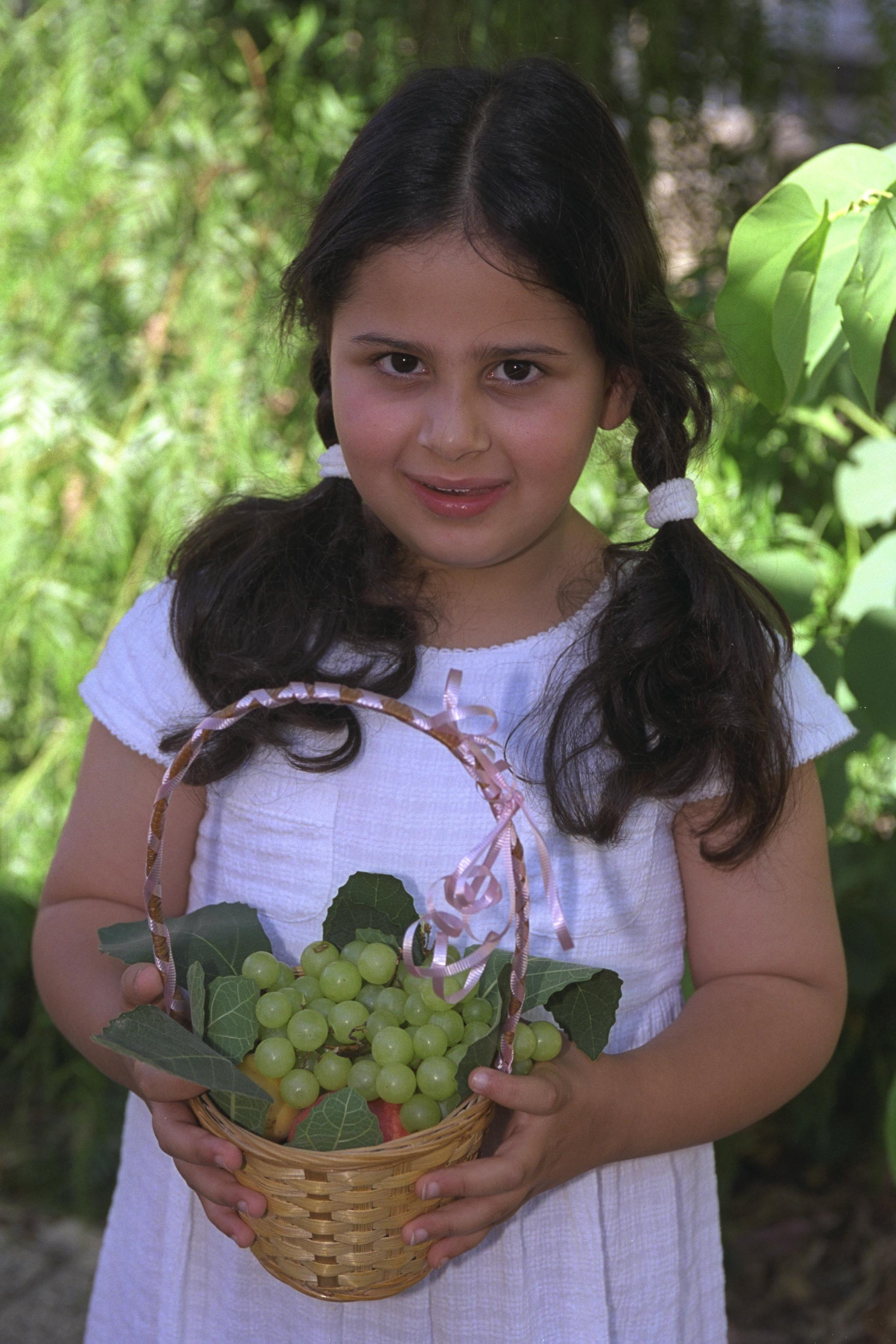
A girl with a tene in Shavuot

Tene (Hebrew: טֶנֶא) is a wicker basket used to hold Bikkurim, a sacrificial offering offered by ancient Israelites to God in the Holy Temple. Bikkurim is a mitzvah that was common in the early days of Judaism, especially in 0-200CE.

== Origin ==
=== Bible ===
The term "tene" (טֶנֶא) is mentioned 3 times in the Hebrew Bible:

Deuteronomy, chapter 26, verse 2:

וְלָקַחְתָּ מֵרֵאשִׁית כָּל פְּרִי הָאֲדָמָה אֲשֶׁר תָּבִיא מֵאַרְצְךָ אֲשֶׁר ה' אֱלֹהֶיךָ נֹתֵן לָךְ וְשַׂמְתָּ בַטֶּנֶא וְהָלַכְתָּ אֶל הַמָּקוֹם אֲשֶׁר יִבְחַר ה' אֱלֹהֶיךָ לְשַׁכֵּן שְׁמוֹ שָׁם

Deuteronomy, chapter 28, verse 5:

בָּרוּךְ פְּרִי-בִטְנְךָ וּפְרִי אַדְמָתְךָ וּפְרִי בְהֶמְתֶּךָ שְׁגַר אֲלָפֶיךָ וְעַשְׁתְּרוֹת צֹאנֶךָ. בָּרוּךְ טַנְאֲךָ וּמִשְׁאַרְתֶּךָ.

And in Mishnah, Mesekhet Tamid, chapter 3, verse 6:

מי שזכו בדישון המזבח הפנימי והמנורה, היו מקדימין לפניהם, וארבעה כלים בידם, הטני והכוז ושני מפתחות. הטני דומה לתרקב של זהב, מחזיק קביים וחצי; והכוז דומה לקיתון גדול של זהב. ושני מפתחות--אחד יורד לאמת שחי, ואחד פותח בו כיוון.

in English translation (NIV), the word "tene", was replaced with "Basket":

take some of the firstfruits of all that you produce from the soil of the land the LORD your God is giving you and put them in a basket. Then go to the place the LORD your God will choose as a dwelling for his Name

=== Research ===
The term "tene" is often linked to an Egyptian word that bears a similar pronunciation and meaning. Some scholars propose that it may have Canaanite origins. In Chazal, the terms "tene" (טֶנֶא) and "teni" (טְנִי) appear several times. They both mean 'bowl' or 'basket' in Hebrew, and they may be the root of all Hebrew words related to baskets, such as: "Sal" (סל, lit. 'basket'), "Salsala" (סלסלה, lit. 'small basket'), etc.

== Modern days ==
In modern days, the Holy Temple does not exist, thus, tene is no longer in use for religious purposes.
