= Poor man's tithe =

Traditional donation in Judaism

The poor man's tithe (Hebrew: מַעְשַׂר עָנִי ma'sar ani), also referred to as the pauper's tithe or the third tithe, is a triennial tithe of one's produce, required in Jewish law. It requires that one tenth of produce grown in the third and sixth years of the seven-year sabbatical cycle be given to the Levites and the poor.

The law applies during the days of the Temple in Jerusalem, and after the Temple's destruction. It applies only to crops that are harvested in the Land of Israel, but during the Seventh Year, also applies to crops harvested in Jordan and Egypt, so that the poor of Israel would be supported in the Seventh Year.

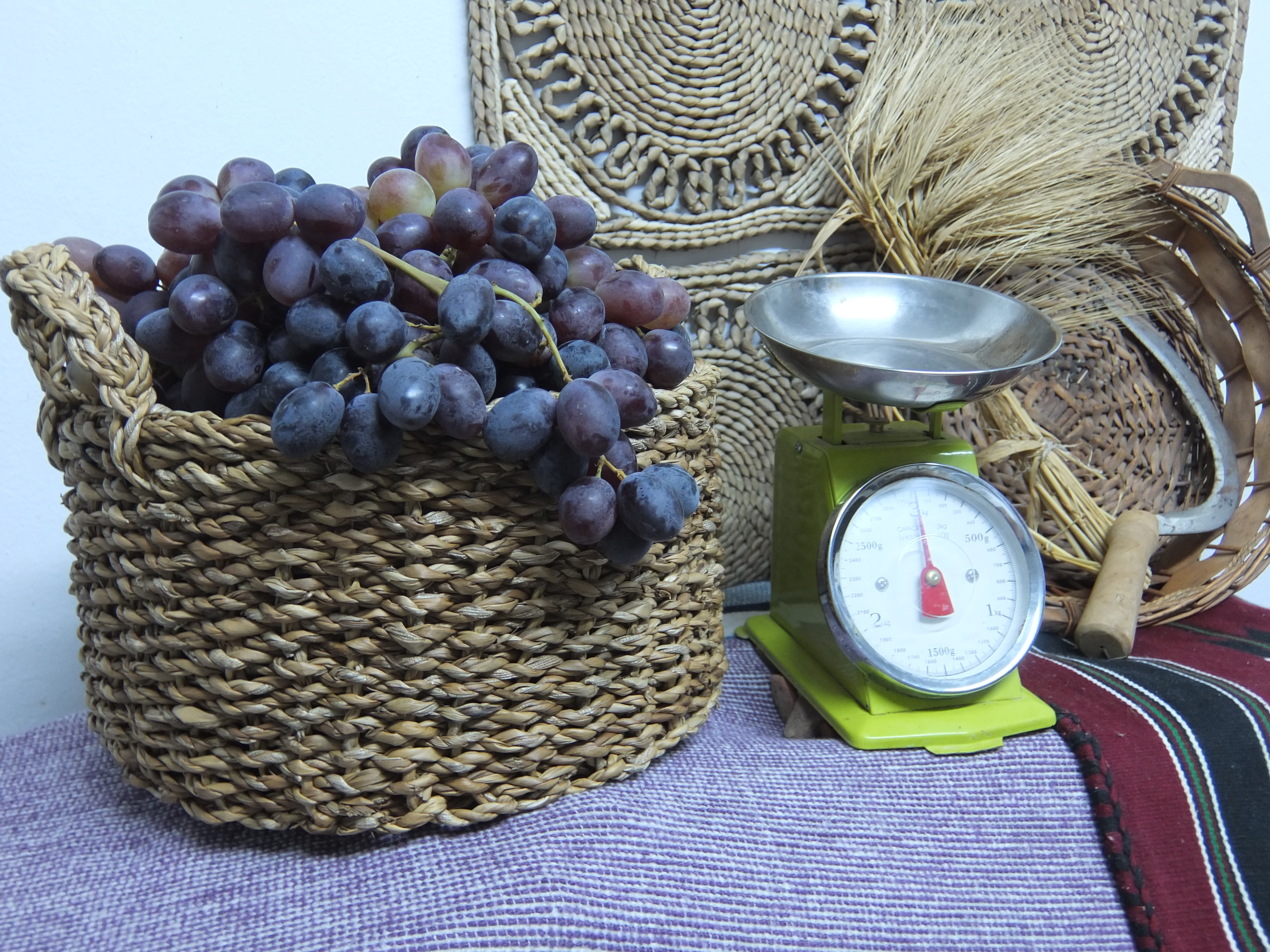
Grapes and barley

== In the Hebrew Bible ==
The poor man's tithe is discussed in the Book of Deuteronomy:

At the end of three years you shall bring forth all the tithe of your produce in that year, and shall lay it up inside your gates. And the Levite, because he has no part nor inheritance with you, and the stranger, and the orphan, and the widow, who are inside your gates, shall come, and shall eat and be satisfied; that the Lord your God may bless you in all the work of your hand which you do. (Deuteronomy 14:28)
When you have finished tithing all the tithes of your produce in the third year, the year of the tithe, you shall give them to the Levite, the stranger, the orphan, and the widow, so that they can eat to satiety in your cities. (Deuteronomy 26:12)

Thus, this tithe is separated from homegrown crops during the 3rd and 6th year of the seven-year cycle.

The early rabbis, the Tannaim and Amoraim, understood these texts as describing two separate tithes: the first tithe (Hebrew: מעשר ראשון ma'aser rishon) to be given to the Levites and the second tithe (Hebrew: מעשר שני ma'aser sheni) in Leviticus 27:30 to be kept by its owner and to be eaten in Jerusalem, except in the third and sixth years of the sabbatical cycle, when instead of separating the second tithe, the poor man's tithe (ma'sar ani) was separated and given to the poor. The medieval commentator Rashi also interprets Deuteronomy 26:12 as referring to the third year, when the first tithe was given to the Levite and the poor tithe was given to "the stranger, the orphan, and the widow".

== In Josephus ==
Jewish-Roman historian Flavius Josephus refers to the first, second, and third (or poor man's) tithe. The third tithe was to be brought to the Levites, every third and sixth year of the seven-year Sabbath cycle. The distribution of which to be given to those in need or want, especially widowed women and orphan children.

== In the Talmud ==
The Babylonian Talmud ruled that the amount of poor man's tithe one gives to a single poor person must be enough to provide for two meals.

The Babylonian Talmud also states that while ma'sar ani technically could be used to feed one's poor father, one should not do so, so as not to embarrass one's father. Rather, a son should try his best to care for his father out of his other property.

The Jerusalem Talmud to Pe'ah 1:1 discusses the maximum amount of one's income/money one can give to the poor and determines that one should not give more than one-fifth of his possessions so he does not become poor himself. This Gemara and a discussion in Sifrei are quoted extensively by later Jewish sages who discussed an ancient custom of tithing 10% of one's income for charity. This tithe, known as ma'sar kesafim, has become a universal practice.

== In Orthodox Judaism ==
Contemporary practice is to set aside terumah, separate first tithe (ma'aser rishon), separate terumat ma'aser, separate either the second tithe (ma'aser sheni) or the poor man's tithe (depending on the year), then (if applicable) redeem the second tithe with a coin.

Orthodox Judaism regards it as meritorious to discharge one's poor man's tithe obligation additionally by giving a portion of one's income, ideally a tenth, to charity.

== See also ==
- Tithes in Judaism
- Heave offering: Teruma gedola
- First tithe: Ma'aser rishon
- Second tithe: Ma'aser sheni
- Terumat hamaaser
- Zakat: alms and tithing in Islam
