= Bikkurim (first-fruits) =

First fruits brought to the Temple in Judaism

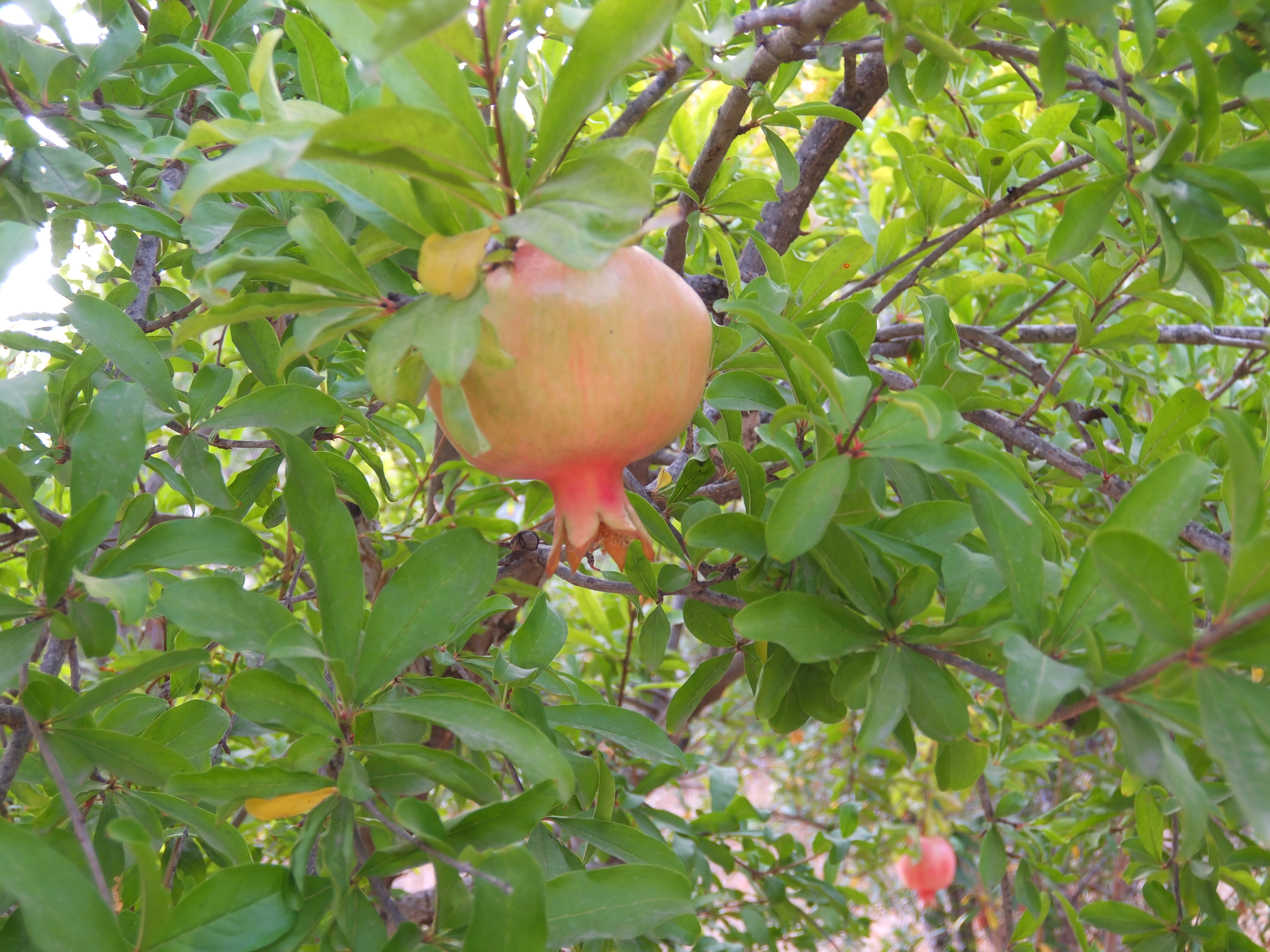
Pomegranate, firstfruit of the season.

Bikkurim (Hebrew: בכורים, /bɪˌkuːˈriːm, bɪˈkʊərɪm/), or first-fruits, are a type of sacrificial offering which was offered by ancient Israelites. In each agricultural season, the first-grown fruits were brought to the Temple and laid by the altar, and a special declaration recited.

The laws of this offering appear in the Bikkurim tractate of the Talmud.

== In the Bible ==
The command to bring first-fruits to the Temple appears in the Torah, in Exodus 23:19 and Deuteronomy 26:1–11. The latter passage records the declaration (also known as the Avowal) which was recited upon presenting the first-fruits to the priest:

...you shall put [the first-fruits] in a basket and shall go unto the place which the LORD your God shall choose to cause His name to dwell there. And you shall come to the priest that will be in those days, and say to him: "I profess this day to the LORD your God, that I have come to the land which the LORD swore to our fathers to give us."

And the priest shall take the basket out of your hand, and set it down before the altar of the LORD your God. And you shall speak and say before the LORD your God: "A wandering Aramean was my father, and he went down into Egypt, and sojourned there, few in number; and he became there a nation, great, mighty, and populous. And the Egyptians dealt ill with us, and afflicted us, and laid upon us hard bondage. And we cried out to the LORD, the God of our fathers, and the LORD heard our voice, and saw our affliction, and our toil, and our oppression. And the LORD brought us forth out of Egypt with a mighty hand, and with an outstretched arm, and with great terribleness, and with signs, and with wonders. And He brought us to this place, and gave us this land, a land flowing with milk and honey. And now, behold, I have brought the first of the fruit of the land, which You, O LORD, have given me."

And you shall set it down before the LORD your God, and prostrate before the LORD your God. And you shall rejoice in all the good which the LORD your God has given to you and to your house - you, and the Levite, and the stranger that is in your midst.

In Exodus 23:16, the holiday of Shavuot is called the "feast of harvest, the first-fruits of your labours (Heb. bikkurei maasecha)", testifying to the link between bikkurim and this holiday, at which time summer fruit was beginning to ripen and bikkurim were brought. In Exodus 34:22 Shavuot is called "the holiday of weeks (shavuot), of the first-fruits of wheat harvest", while Numbers 28:26 simply calls it "the day of first-fruits".

Leviticus 2:14 describes the omer offering, brought on Passover, as bikkurim (of barley). In Leviticus 23:9 it is described as reishit ketzirchem (the first of your harvest) but not as bikkurim.

Leviticus 23:17 describes the special offering of shtei halechem on Shavuot, referring to it as bikkurim (first-fruits of the wheat harvest).

== In rabbinic literature ==
By the time of classical antiquity, extensive regulations regarding Bikkurim were recorded in the classical rabbinical literature.

=== Laws ===
The major obligation to bring Bikkurim to the Temple began at the festival of Shavuot and continued until the festival of Sukkot. The fruits were limited to Seven Species grown in the Land of Israel, such as dried figs, grapes and raisins, pomegranates, barley, wheat and dates, etc., although one rabbi assumes that apart from these species, other species can also be offered. No specific amount is prescribed for these offerings.

The person bringing Bikkurim must be the legal property owner of the land on which the fruits were grown; therefore, share-croppers and usurping occupants were not permitted to bring them.

Native-born Israelites would bring the Bikkurim and would say the Avowal, but women who brought the Bikkurim were not permitted to say the Avowal, since they could not truthfully recite "the land which You have given me" (Deut 26:10) as the land of Israel was bequeathed to the tribes by their male lineage.

Similarly, the Mishna prohibits converts from reciting the Avowal, as they could not truthfully recite "Which the Lord swore to our Fathers for to give us" (Deut 26:3), as they are not descended from the Biblical patriarchs who received that oath; similarly, Deut 26:5 refers to "my father" Jacob, whom converts are not actually descended from. However, Maimonides ruled (in accordance with the Jerusalem Talmud) that the Avowal was also stated by converts; although converts cannot claim physical descent from Jacob, they could still claim to be of Abraham's progeny, since the Torah testifies that Abraham would become "the father of many nations" (Gen 17:5). Moreover, even converts had a portion in the Land, by virtue of the Torah allowing them to be allotted land in the suburbs of the cities occupied by the tribes (Ezekiel 47:21–23).

=== Procedure ===
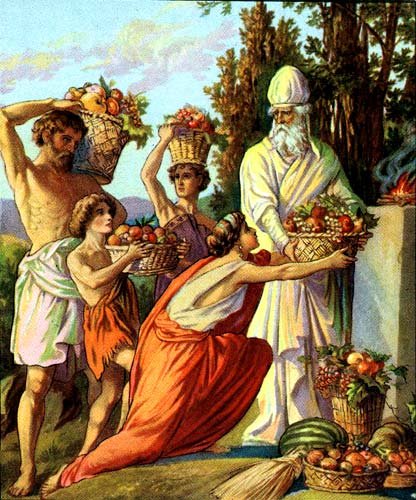
Offering of the first fruits, illustration from a Bible card

Fruits were selected for the offering as follows: Upon visiting his field and seeing a fig, or a grape, or a pomegranate that was ripe, the owner would tie a cord of reed-grass or similar fiber around the fruit, saying, "This shall be among the bikkurim." According to Simeon, he had to repeat the express designation after the fruit had been plucked from the tree in the orchard.

The bringing of first-fruits was incorporated into a grand and festive celebration, with a procession of pilgrims marching up to Jerusalem and then the Temple.

Stations, with deputations representing the people of all the cities in the district, assembled in the chief town of the district, and stayed there overnight in the open squares, without going into the houses. At dawn the officer in charge called out: "Arise, let us ascend to Zion, the house of the Lord our God." Those from the neighborhood brought fresh figs and grapes, those from a distance dried figs and raisins.

A bull with horns gilded and head wreathed with olive-leaves, led the procession, which was accompanied with flute-playing. The fruits were brought in gold, silver or willow baskets to which live doves were tied. When they arrived near the Holy City, the pilgrims sent messengers ahead while they decorated the Firstfruits. The Temple officers came out to meet them, and all artisans along the streets rose before them, giving them the salutation of peace, and hailing them as brothers from this or that town.

The flute kept sounding until they reached the Temple Mount. Here even King Agrippa, following the custom, took his basket on his shoulder, and marched in the ranks, until they came to the outer court and hall. The Levites would then break out in song. The doves were given as sacrificial offerings, and the Avowal (Deuteronomy 26:3–11) would be made before a priest while the basket was still on the pilgrim's shoulder. At the words "a wandering Aramean was my father", the basket was deposed from the shoulder, but while the owner was still holding its handles or rims, a priest put his hand under it and "swung it" (lifted it up), and repeated the words "a wandering Aramean was my father", etc., until the end of the recitation. Then the basket was placed by the Altar and the pilgrim would bow and leave.

=== Interpretations ===
Keli Yakar explains that the Land of Israel is sustained by rainfall, whereas crops in Egypt are irrigated by the waters of the Nile river which requires human intervention, making it logical that the first fruits of Israel be presented to God who brings its rainfall.

== See also ==
- Bikkurim (Talmud)
- Terumah (offering), an agricultural tithe, with some laws similar to bikkurim
