= Terumat hamaaser =

Religious tithe in Judaism

In the Hebrew Bible, the tithe of the tithes (Hebrew: תרומת המעשר terumat ha-maaser) is a mitzvah (biblical requirement) for the recipient Levite to give to the priest a tenth (10%) of the tithe of produce that the former received from the Israelites. It applies only to agricultural produce grown in the Land of Israel.

This "tithe of the tithes" is a derivative of the tithe offering (Hebrew: תרומת המעשר terumat ha-maaser) – a rabbinical Hebrew term based on the commandment in the Hebrew Bible to give a tithe maaser of 10% to the Levites. The first term, terumah, means offering. The term tithe offering, terumat ha-maaser, is alluded to in the Hebrew Bible text under the words "a tithe (tenth) of the tithe" (Numbers 18:26).

== Hebrew Bible ==
The term tithe (Hebrew: מעשר maaser) occurs ten times in the Masoretic Text of the Hebrew Bible, in addition to the term maasar hamaaser (Hebrew: מַעֲשַׂר הַמַּעֲשֵׂר 'tithe of the tithe', in the Septuagint Greek: δεκάτῃ τῆς δεκάτης dekate tes dekates) which occurs once only in Nehemiah 10:39.

This offering is to be distinguished from the "offering tribute" (Hebrew: תרומת המכס terumat hamekhes) which Moses gave to God in Numbers 31:41.

== Rabbinical interpretation ==
The gift of terumat ha-maaser was generally not given by the Israelite directly to the priest. Rather, it was given to a Levite, as the recipient of maaser rishon ('first tithe'; Hebrew: מעשר ראשון), and then the Levite gave of ten percent of his maaser rishon gift directly to the kohen. After the edict of Ezra, which directed maaser rishon to be given to the priest, it became the Kohen's responsibility to give one tenth of his maaser rishon gift to another priest of his choice.

In the Hebrew Bible, the terumah ('offering') was regarded as a kind of sacred korban (also 'offering'). It could be eaten only by Jewish priests and their families, had to be ritually pure, had to be eaten while in a state of ritual purity, and could not be taken out of the Land of Israel.

== In modern times ==
Orthodox Judaism requires taking terumah from produce grown in Israel, although in the absence of a Temple it is no longer given to the priests. In contemporary practice, most of the Terumah and various other biblical tithes (including first tithe and second tithe are first set aside. The 'second tithe' (maaser sheni) is then redeemed upon a coin of nominal value (not generally equal to the value of the produce). The coin and the unredeemable portion of the produce are then discarded in a manner that prevents their use. The reason for discarding in such a manner is that taking these tithes are sacred and must be preserved in a state of "purity" (Hebrew: טהרה tahara) and eaten by a priest in a state of purity. In contemporary times, all people are considered to be defiled by a type of "impurity" (Hebrew: טומאה tumah) which can only be purified through the ritual of the red heifer (Hebrew: פרה אדומה parah adumah). It has not been possible to perform this sacrifice since the destruction of the Second Temple. Since it is forbidden to defile terumah, the produce must be discarded in a manner commensurate with its holiness.

== See also ==
- Heave offering, great tribute
- Maaser Rishon, first tithe
- Maaser Sheni, second tithe
- Maaser Ani, poor man's tithe
