= Second tithe =

Tithe mentioned in the Hebrew Bible

The second tithe (Hebrew: ma'aser sheni מעשר שני) is a tithe mentioned in the Hebrew Bible and practised within Orthodox Judaism. It is distinguished from the first tithe (Hebrew: ma'aser rishon מעשר ראשון), the third or poor tithe, and the terumat hamaaser.

In the days of the Temple in Jerusalem, the second tithe involved the setting aside of one tenth of specific agricultural produce during the first, second, fourth and fifth years of each seven-year cycle, for the purpose of taking it to the holy city of Jerusalem, and consuming it there.

== In the Hebrew Bible ==
Instructions for the second tithe are provided in Deuteronomy 14:22–27, supported by references in Deuteronomy 12:11–18 and 26:12. Deuteronomy 14:28–29 provides instructions for the third or poor tithe, which is performed in the third and sixth years of the seven-year cycle. The remaining seventh year is described as the Shmita, the Sabbatical Year.

As described, the tithe should be of grain, wine, and olive oil, but if the distance to Jerusalem made the carriage of these crops unreasonable, the monetary value of the tithe could be brought to Jerusalem instead, and used to purchase anything edible that the owner desired to eat there - an ox, a sheep, some wine, or beer, or "whatever your soul desires" - for a feast with the person's household in the presence of God.

== In the Mishna and Talmud ==
The Mishnah, in Tractate Rosh Hashanah, describes four new years for various purposes. The new year for tithes for general crops is the first of Tishrei (the holiday of Rosh Hashanah), for animal tithes the first of Elul, and for the produce of trees the fifteenth of Shevat (the holiday of Tu Bishvat). The Talmud and later commentaries reflect a substantial amount of debate about the start and end of the tithing year for various types of crops in various situations.

== The practice of the ma'aser sheni ==
The second tithe is a distinct tithing obligation of 10% of the produce after terumah and the first tithe were separated. If any of these tithes were not separated, the produce was known as tevel and forbidden for consumption. The owner of the produce was required to separate tithe, of any kind, after the particular kind of produce was finished in its common preparation for ingathering. Unlike the first tithe, the second tithe was only separated on the first, second, fourth and fifth years of the sabbatical year cycle. The poor tithe was separated on the third and sixth years.

The produce was required to be maintained in a state of purity and eaten in a state of purity in Jerusalem, at any time of the year. If the owner did not desire or was unable to bring the produce to Jerusalem, he was entitled to redeem the produce on a coin of equal value, in addition to adding a fifth to the value. The ability to redeem produce on money results in money which is mikudash (sacred, as earmarked for Temple purposes), while the produce became desanctified and available for ordinary use. The money could only be used for limited categories of use in keeping with its sacred status. Improper spending of the money was forbidden.

After the Second Temple's destruction and the inability to consume fruits of Second Tithe in a state of ritual cleanness, the general practice was to redeem the produce and its sanctity on a coin, and to discard the coin, or else to separate the Second Tithe and to profane its sanctity by having it transferred to a smaller piece of produce of its own kind, such as wine upon wine and grain upon grain. Afterwards, the smaller piece (to which the fruit's Second Tithe sanctity has been transferred) is discarded. In the absence of the Temple and ritual purity, second tithe produce valued at one-hundred denarii can be redeemed on a perutah, and does not require redeeming its full monetary value.

The Chazon Ish does not permit redeeming one's Second Tithe on sugar, even though the sugar is produced from the sugarcane or from sugar beets.

Before one actually separates the designated tithes (e.g. Terumah, First tithe, Tithe of the Terumah, Second tithe or, in other years, the Poor man's tithe), he makes one, all-inclusive blessing: "Blessed are you, O Lord our God, King of the universe, who has commanded us to separate the priestly dues (terumot) and the tithes (ma'aserot)." The redemption of the Second Tithe is preceded by the blessing: "Blessed are you, O Lord our God, King of the universe, who has commanded us concerning the redemption of the Second Tithe."

The Scriptures include a commandment to remove all the tithes from one's house in the end of the third year (Deuteronomy 14:28).

Since the Torah enjoined the owner of the produce to share the second tithe with the poor, needy and disenfranchised, a large portion was shared as a form of charity.

== In contemporary Orthodox Judaism ==
Orthodox Judaism still regards tithe obligations as in effect on produce grown in the Land of Israel, although proceeds from the tithes are no longer given to a Kohen or Levite or taken to Jerusalem.

Contemporary practice is to set aside terumah, separate first tithe (ma'aser rishon), separate terumat ma'aser, separate either the second tithe or the poor tithe (depending on the year), then (if applicable) redeem the second tithe with a coin. The coin can be a minimal amount capable of purchasing food and need not be the value of the produce. When the value of the coin is "filled", the coin can be redeemed on a coin of higher value or discarded in a way that prevents its future use.

Terumah and terumat ma'aser must be discarded in a manner consistent with their sanctity. The reason for discarding in such a manner is that the set-aside produce is still considered mikudash or sacred. While dedicated offerings cannot actually be offered in their traditional form in the absence of the Temple, because one must consume terumah and maaser sheni in a state of purity, they also cannot be used for mundane purposes. However, the mundane use of maaser sheni was not considered me'ilah (unauthorized or inappropriate use of Temple property/hekdesh).

Every three years, on the mincha (afternoon service) of the last day of Pesach (Passover), they would say the Vidui Maaser (a confession of tithing prescribed specifically in the Torah). The reason this is done at the end of the festival, at the last prayer is because until that time (during the Temple era), people were still eating their Maaser Sheni.

== Critical perspectives ==
In Classical Rabbinical Literature, according to which the entire Torah was principally written by a single author (Moses), the maaser sheni, and maaser ani were contrasted with the Maaser Rishon as entirely different tithes from each other, and for this reason gave the tithes the distinct names they possess.

However, according to the view of some textual scholars, the latter tithe, which is mentioned in the Priestly Code, and constitutes an annual tithe given over to the Levites, additionally tithing cattle and wine, is a conflicting version of the same single tithe as the tithe formed by the maaser ani and maaser sheni taken together; the maaser ani and maaser sheni together being the Deuteronomist's version and the maaser rishon being the version of the priestly source; despite the fact that those tithes appear in both Leviticus and Deuteronomy. The Jewish Encyclopedia article (1911) concludes that there is no significant textual evidence that the tithes come from different sources and the theory ignores the role of terumah and terumat maaser, which were separated for the priests. In both alleged "versions" it is required that a portion be given to the Leviim because they had no inheritance of land, unlike the other tribes, and were considered to be more likely to be supported by others' property. Although the deuteronomist is generally considered to be a later author than the priestly source, scholars believe that much of the Deuteronomic Code was a reaction against the regulations introduced by the Priestly Code, and that here it reflects the earlier situation.

Some scholars speculate that maaser sheni developed as a tribute to the king; the Books of Samuel mention that the Israelites were ordered by Samuel (speaking on behalf of God) to give a tenth of everything to the king, seemingly referring to such a tribute in a passage (1 Samuel 8:15) which textual scholars believe belongs to the monarchial source, and predates both the Priestly Code and the Deuteronomic Code. This is in contrast to the reading of the text which was a warning by Samuel to the Children of Israel about the abuses of power that a king may impose. There is no example of an Israelite king actually imposing such a 10% tax. Further, ma'aser sheni was retained for consumption by the farmer who produced the crop or redeemed by said farmer for money to be used by him and his family. Some scholars speculate that these tributes began to be used for public festivals, often including religious ones, and thus gradually came to be seen as associated with the priests. Once again, this is unlikely as the Levites who received ma'aser rishon were not priests (called "kohanim"). The kohanim received terumah and terumat ma'aser from the Leviim, not ma'aser rishon, as would be thought if they had written the Torah to enhance their own agenda. Moreover, this has nothing to do with ma'aser sheni, which, once again, was retained by the farmer who was liable to separate the tithe.

== See also ==
- Teruma gedola, the great tribute
- Terumat HaMaaser
- Maaser Rishon, the first tithe
- Maaser Ani, the poor tithe
