= First tithe =

Tenth of agricultural produce, given to the Kohen

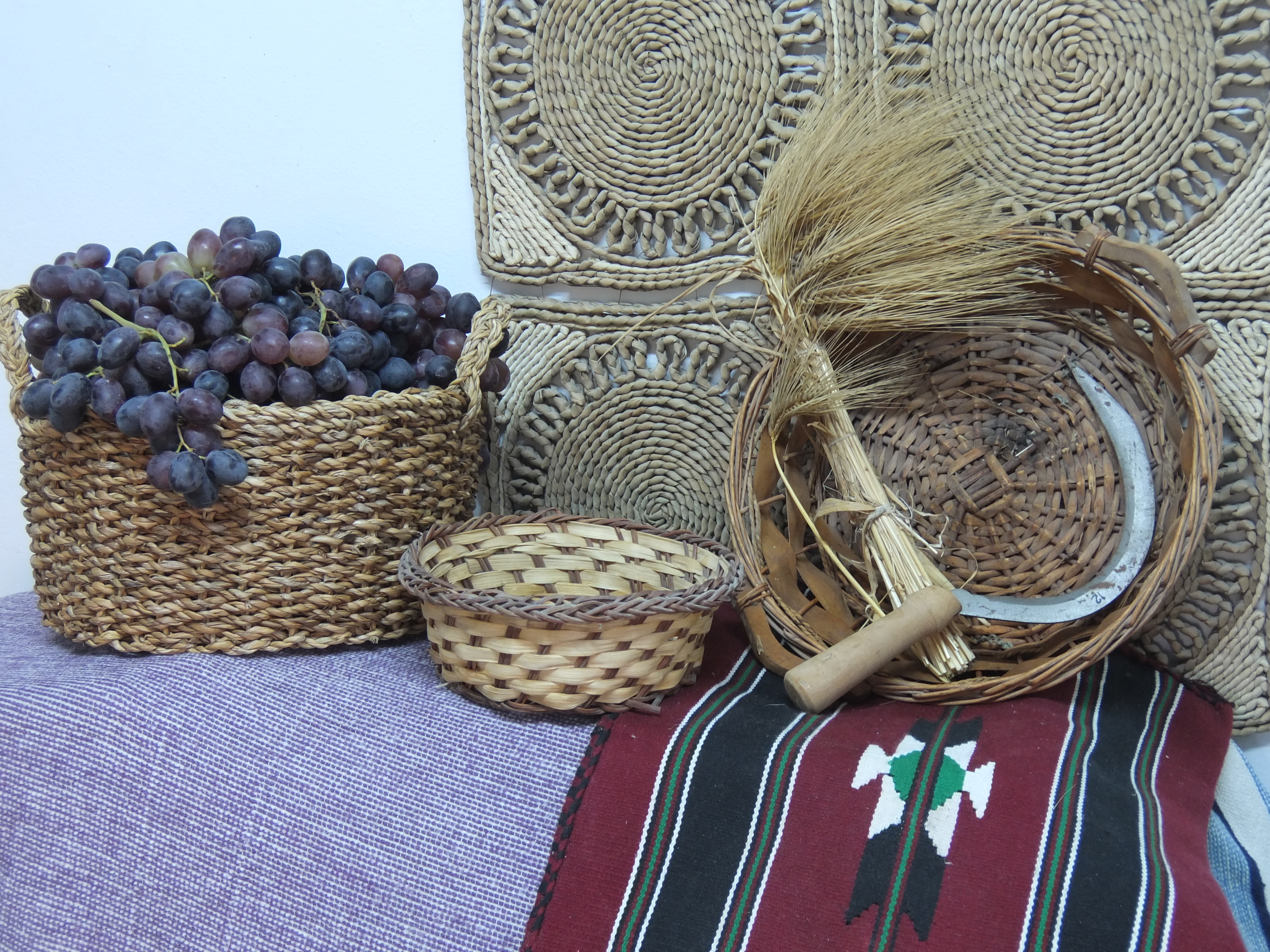
Harvested grapes in basket and reaped barley

The first tithe (Hebrew: מעשר ראשון, romanized: maʿśēr rîshôn) is a positive commandment in the Torah requiring the giving of one tenth of agricultural produce to charity, after the giving of the standard terumah, to the Levite (or Kohen). This tithe is required to be free of both monetary and servicial compensation.

Originally, during the First Temple period, the tithe was given to the Levite. Approximately at the beginning of the Second Temple construction, Ezra and his beth din implemented its giving to the kohanim. However, this rule was nullified with the destruction of the Second Temple, and since then the tithe has been given to Levites once again.

== Hebrew Bible ==
The tithe gift is discussed in the Hebrew Bible (Numbers 18:21–26) according to which a tenth of the produce was to be presented to a Levite who then gave a tenth of the first tithe to a kohen (Numbers 18:26). Tithing was seen as performing a mitzvah done in joyful obedience to God. Giving tithe would open oneself up to receipt of divine blessing.

== Regulations ==
The Torah instructs that the tithe should be of the "five grains" (see Species of grain), wine, olive oil, fruit, and cattle. The time for taking such tithes was at the finished stage of processing the produce. Unlike terumah given to the Kohen, the ma'aser rishon was not regarded as sacred, and as a result did not have to be ritually pure, neither was it required to be eaten in any particular location (such as the Temple in Jerusalem). Once received by the Levite, it was regarded simply as ordinary property, and they could pass it on to non-Levites, or sell it, as they wished.

Traditionally tithes were calculated for the produce of each whole year, however Chazalic Literature indicates that there was a debate between Beit Shammai and Beit Hillel as to when this tithing year should begin and end. Tithing years had different starts and ends depending on the particular crop in question; land crops began their tithe year on the first of Tishrei (Rosh Hashanah); according to Eleazar ben Shammua and Simeon bar Yohai the first of Tishri was also the start of the tithe year for cattle, but according to Rabbi Meir it was the first of Elul that held this honour. The followers of Hillel argued that the tithe year for fruit from trees began on the fifteenth of Shevat, but the followers of Shammai, his rival, argued that it began on the first of Shevat; the view of Hillel's followers eventually became the majority view and the new year for trees – Tu Bishvat – is now held at the date which they considered appropriate.

== Contemporary practice ==
Orthodox Judaism regards the tithe as still being required for any produce grown within the historic boundaries of the ancient Kingdoms of Israel and of Judah, covering the modern territories of the state of Israel, West Bank, Gaza Strip, Golan Heights, and portions of western Jordan. However, because ma'aser rishon has no inherent sanctity, consistent with Numbers 18:31 (Levite tithes are wages), after terumat ma'aser has been removed, it is governed by the monetary civil laws which put the proof of a claim for monetary compensation on the person making the demand (the plaintiff). Since the lineage of the Levites is currently uncertain, there is no obligation to provide ma'aser rishon to a questionable Levi, whereas, there is no rabbinic prohibition by doing so.

Contemporary practice, after designating and setting aside terumah, is to make a formal declaration that the portion set aside is ma'aser rishon. Afterwards, terumat ma'aser is designated and set aside. Finally, depending on the year, ma'aser sheni or ma'sar ani are designated and tithed in the appropriate manner.

While tithes from produce may not be given to a Kohen or Levite, they may be fed to their animals.

Today, Ma'aser is also referred to the minhag of giving 10% of ones earnings to tzedaka.

== In secular academic works ==
In classical rabbinical literature, according to which the entire Torah was principally written by Moses, the first tithe is contrasted with the poor tithe, and second tithe, as entirely different tithes from each other, and for this reason gave the tithes the distinct names they possess; these latter tithes, which are mentioned by the Deuteronomic Code, differ by not covering cattle or fruit, and rather than just going to the Levites, are in one case shared among the poor and other charitable destinations, and in the other go to the food producer themselves. According to some secular scholars, the poor tithe and the second tithe, when taken together, are a conflicting version of the same single tithe as the first tithe; the poor tithe and second tithe together being the Deuteronomist's version and the first time being the version of the priestly source.

Although such scholars speculate that the deuteronomist is a later author than the priestly source, scholars believe that much of the Deuteronomic Code was a reaction against the regulations introduced by the Priestly Code, and that here it reflects the earlier situation. In the Book of Ezekiel, which some scholars believe predates the Priestly Code, meaning that according to their view the Priestly Code must post-date the Babylonian Exile, there is no mention whatever of a tithe appointed for the Levites, and in the Deuteronomic Code, though Levites have a share of the ma'aser sheni, their share is seemingly voluntary, and it can alternatively be given to strangers, widows, and/or paternal orphans; in the Priestly Code, however, donation of the tithe to the Levites is compulsory.

The clear differentiation between the kohens (the priests) and the other Levites, in the regulations given by the Priestly Code for the ma'aser rishon, is a distinction scholars attribute to the pro-Aaronid political bias of the priestly source; according to the Biblical revisionists' worldview, all Levites can be legitimate priests, which is likely to be why the Deuteronomist does not mention a tithe of the tithe (the portion of the tithe which is given to the priests rather than other Levites), since it would be somewhat meaningless. On the other hand, it raises a question about the distinction between ma'aser and terumah. In the Priestly Code it is stated that the ma'aser rishon existed as the source of sustenance for the Levites, since they had no territory, and hence nowhere to keep livestock or perform agriculture (Numbers 18:21–24). but this seemingly neglects the existence of a number of scattered Levite cities; scholars believe that the tithe (i.e. the tithe of which the ma'sar ani and ma'aser rishon are conflicting versions) actually arose as a generic heave offering, given to priests at the sanctuaries for their sustenance, and only became distinct when the Aaronids began to position themselves as the only Levites that could be legitimate priests. This view neglects the fact that cities are not agricultural centers and the tithing laws focus on agricultural produce. According to a holistic view of the Torah, the Levites had no portion in the fields. The Book of Amos, cited by some scholars for support of their proposition, admonishes the Israelites about their rebellious offerings to idols by mentioning practices that would be acceptable to idolatry but not Torah Law.

== See also ==
- Heave offering
- Terumat hamaaser
- Second tithe
- Poor tithe
- Tithes in Judaism
