= Terumah (offering) =

Type of sacrifice in Judaism

A terumah (Hebrew: תְּרוּמָה), the priestly dues or heave offering, is a type of offering in Judaism. The word is generally used for offerings to God, but can also refer to gifts to a human.

The word terumah refers to various types of offerings, but most commonly to terumah gedolah (תרומה גדולה, "great offering"), which must be separated from agricultural produce and given to a kohen (a priest of Aaron's lineage), who must eat it in a state of ritual purity. Those separating the terumah unto the priests during the time when the Temple stood were required, as a rule, to do so also in a state of ritual purity, as being unclean could render the terumah unfit for consumption. Today, the terumah is separated and either burnt or discarded.

== Etymology ==
The word terumah ("lifting up") comes from the verb stem, rum (רוּם, "high" or "to lift up"). The formation of terumah is parallel to the formation of tenufah ('תְּנוּפָה, wave offering) from the verb stem nuf, "to wave", and both are found in the Hebrew Bible. In a few verses, English Bible translations (such as the King James Version) have translated "heave offering", by analogy with "wave offering":

And thou shalt sanctify the breast of the wave offering, and the shoulder of the heave offering, which is waved, and which is heaved up, of the ram of the consecration, even of that which is for Aaron, and of that which is for his sons:.

Speak to the children of Israel, and say to them: 'When you come into the land to which I bring you, 'then it will be, when you eat of the bread of the land, that you shall offer up a heave offering to the Lord..

== Hebrew Bible ==
The term occurs seventy-six times in the Biblical Hebrew Masoretic Text of the Hebrew Bible; in the Greek Septuagint it was rendered aphieroma (ἀφιέρωμα), in the 1917 JPS Tanakh it is generally translated "offering"; while in the King James Version (1611) it is also generally translated "offering" but also sometimes "oblation" and four times "heave offering".

The word is used in various contexts throughout the Hebrew Bible, including one use in Proverbs which may denote haughtiness or graft. In most contexts it refers to designating something for a higher purpose, or lifting apart of a quantity from a larger quantity).

The Bible refers to the following offerings, among others, using the term terumah or the verb leharim:

- The gifts offered by the Israelites for the inauguration of the Tabernacle (Mishkan)
- Portion of gift offerings, of slaughter offerings, which were allocated to the priests.
- The half-shekel Temple tax
- The dough offering (challah)
- The meat of Israelites' sin- and guilt-offerings
- Various priestly gifts: terumah gedolah, Bikkurim (first-fruits), herem, bechor, pidyon haben
- The first tithe
- Terumat maaser
- Spoils given to Eleazar after the war with Midian
- In Ezekiel's prophecy, gifts that were to be given to the nasi (prince or king)
- In Ezekiel's prophecy, land which was to be set aside for use of the Temple, priests, and Levites

== Terumah gedolah ==
In halakah (Jewish law), the word terumah by itself refers to the "great offering" (terumah gedolah). According to Hizkuni, this terumah is called "great" because it is the first of all tithes given on produce, and thus is given from the "greatest quantity of produce" before any other gift is given. The Mishnah, Tosefta, and Gemara include a tract entitled Terumot which deals with the laws regulating terumah.

Terumah gedolah must be given to the Jewish priest and is considered one of the twenty-four priestly gifts. The consumption of terumah (both terumah gedolah and terumat hamaaser) is restricted by numerous Torah-based commandments and could be eaten by priests, their families, and their servants. Israelites would separate this terumah from their finished grain, wine, and oil prior to separating maaser rishon for Levites. Unlike the maaser rishon, the Torah did not specify any minimum measure for terumah gedolah; hence, even one grain of barley could satisfy the requirement to separate terumah. However, based on Ezekiel 45:13, the rabbis conclude that an "average" offering would be 1/50 of the produce, a generous one 1/40, and a stingy one 1/60.

Terumah gedolah could only be separated from the non-tithed produce (tevel), and terumat maaser could only be separated from maaser rishon by its owner (or an authorized, legally permissible agent). Minors, deaf-mutes, the mentally ill, and non-Jews were not obligated to perform such separation. However, while non-Jews could not act as agents for Jews to separate terumah, the terumah owned by and separated by non-Jews was considered valid and had the status and sanctity of terumah.

Produce designated for the poor (peah, leket, shichecha) and unowned crops were not subjected to (and could not be used as) terumah. Each type of produce had to be individually tithed. A small whole fruit was preferably given rather than part of a larger fruit. Terumah had to include the best produce if a kohen (priest) lived nearby.

=== Purity ===
Terumah is designated for the priests, who must be separated in a state of ritual purity. The phenomenon of priests purifying themselves to eat terumah was so well-known that nightfall (when their pure status would take effect after immersion in a mikveh) was described as "the hour when priests enter to eat their terumah".

In addition, it is forbidden to intentionally cause terumah to become impure. Israelites who separate the terumah for the priests may still do so in a state of ritual impurity, so long as the fruits touched by them have not come in contact with water after being picked from the tree or uprooted from the ground, or such as with one of the seven liquids that make the fruits susceptible to uncleanness (wine, blood, oil, milk, dew, bees' honey, and water (Note: According to the Mishnah (Makshirin 6:5): "Under water is included any liquid that comes forth from the eye, ear, nose, or mouth; liquid excrement and urine, whether it issues intentionally or unintentionally.")). If the fruits were made wet by one of these liquids and a person who was ritually unclean had then touched them, the fruits become defiled.

All people nowadays are presumed to be impure due to corpse uncleanness, so terumah cannot currently be eaten by priests. Impure terumah generally must be burnt, but can also be eaten by the priest's livestock. Thus, in modern Israel, it is common for priests to be made partial owners of zoos and similar institutions so that terumah separated from commercial produce can be donated to them and not wasted. Similarly, terumah from olive oil may be used by priests to light lamps, and is known as shemen s'reifah (Hebrew: שמן שריפה).

== See also ==
- Terumah (parashah) – the nineteenth weekly portion of the Torah. It primarily contains the instructions on how to create the Tabernacle.
