= Georg Christian Adler =

German theologian (1734–1804)

Georg Christian Adler (May 6, 1734 – November 2, 1804) was a German scholar.

Adler was born in Brandenburg, and studied theology at the University of Halle. In 1755, he was appointed preacher (prediger) in Arnis, Schleswig; in 1758 in Sarau; and in 1759 in Altona. He remained in Altona, where he became provost in 1791, and died in 1804.

He was interested in Roman antiquities, and published a book on the subject by Maternus de Cilano in 1775, in addition to writing several of his own. His major works are Ausführliche Beschreibung der Stadt Rom (1781–82, 4 vols.), on the city of Rome; Nachricht von den pontinischen Sümpfen (1784), on the Pontine Marshes; and an edition of the writings of Sextus Julius Frontinus (1792).

His son, Jacob Georg Christian Adler, was also a noted scholar.

== Bibliography ==
- Karl Ludwig Urlichs (1875). "Adler, Georg Christian". Allgemeine Deutsche Biographie. Allgemeine Deutsche Biographie (in German). Vol. 1. p. 85.
