= Blechreiz =

German ska band

- Genres: Ska
- Years active: 1983–1996, 2008–present
- Members: Chris „Prüfer“ Proofley (Voc., shouts); Rüdiger "Rütze" Rossig (Voc., Guitar); Olli „Professor“ Scholz (Voc., Guitar); Matthias Bonjer (Bass); Hermann Lamboy (Drums); J.B. Beat (Organ); Michael Rühl (Tenor sax Wolfram Segond von Banchet (Alt sax); Hannes Maczey (Trumpet)
- Past members: Marcus Renner (Vocals, trumpet), Mike „2 Tische“ Betz (Guitar), Lorenzo Allacher (Tenor sax), Christopher 'Joisy' Großkopf (Drums), Eike Dierks (Drums), Johannes 'Honey' Wagemann (Guitar), Oli Petrowski (Guitar), Christian 'Benny' Bennat (Trombone), Folke 'The Shoplifter' Paulsen (Voc.)

Blechreiz is a German ska band founded in 1983 in southern Berlin. Along with Skaos from Bavarian Krumbach, No Sports, The Braces from Jülich, El Bosso & die Ping-Pongs from Munster and The Busters from Wiesloch, Blechreiz was one of the pioneers of the German ska scene at the end of the 1980s and the beginning of the 1990s. The band mostly plays songs it writes and arranges itself. A number of changes in the lineup has meant that Blechreiz’s style has varied over the years. Blechreiz allies itself with anti-racist and anti-fascist skinheads such as Skinheads Against Racial Prejudice (SHARP).

== History ==
In summer 1989, Blechreiz planned a joint tour of the still-securely-walled-in GDR with Michele Baresi, then the only ska band in East Berlin. Although the tour was initially a victim of pre-reunification administrative chaos, it took place when the wall came down in the spring of 1990. Many of the concert venues Blechreiz played in had never before hosted a band from the West. In the next few years, many concerts and tours in Germany and guest appearances in France, London, northern Italy, Belgium, Austria and Poland built the band and its stage show’s reputation.

In 1993, Berlin’s concertgoers picked Blechreiz as the Best Live Band in Berlin. A concert featuring many guest stars in the Tempodrom concert hall in Berlin generated acclaim from the press. Together with ‘volxmusic’ band Apparatschik, Blechreiz initiated the SKASDROWJE project in 1994. As a big band formation, they played Russian folk music in ska rhythm at a variety of festivals. In 1995, Blechreiz was featured in TV film „Which Side Are You On – Ska in Berlin“. It contained film portraits of ska bands Blechreiz West-Berlin) and Michele Baresi.

1996 saw the band's farewell tour in Germany. Their last concert was held in SO36 in Berlin Kreuzberg. Blechreiz reformed in its original lineup in 2008. The kick-off concert was held in the Red Salon in Berlin Mitte on 29 February 2008. Since then, the band has recorded one new album and played gigs in various places in Germany, the Czech Republic, Poland and Spain.

In 2022, Blechreiz released an album entitled "Flight Of The Bumble Bee" (on CD with 16 tracks and on vinyl LP with 13 tracks), featuring the ska band Memoria Insuficiente from Bogota, Colombia.

In September 2023, Blechreiz began playing selected anniversary concerts to mark their 40th anniversary, which were spread across the whole of Germany.

In March and December 2024, concert recordings were made during live shows in Greiz and Berlin, which were released in November 2025 in the form of the live album "Live & Loud".

== Discography ==
=== Albums ===
- 1988: Out Tonight (Tape-Recording/Blechreiz)
- 1990: Who Napped JB (Rude Records)
- 1991: Who Napped JB – CD inkl. Bonus Tracks (Rude Records)
- 1993: Which Side Are You On? (Traumton / Zensor)
- 1994: Rude Gangsters – LP-CD (Traumton / Zensor)
- 1995: Schnaps oder Suppe – Live-LP-CD (Traumton / Zensor)
- 2009: Those ~~were~~ are the Days – Live-CD (Blechreiz)
- 2021: Who Napped JB - 30 Years Reissue, limited Vinyl Edition (Black Butcher Records / Mad Butcher Records)
- 2022: Flight of the Bumble Bee (Pork Pie Records, PP CD 01943) (Smith & Miller Records, SMR LP015)
- 2025: Live & Loud, (Smith & Miller Records CD + Vinyl LP, Smith & Miller Records, SMR LP074)

=== EPs ===
- 1993: Loving Couple – EP-CD (Traumton / Zensor)
- 1994: Rude Gangsters – EP-CD (Traumton / Zensor)
- 1996: Die Jungs sind wieder da – EP-CD (Blechreiz)

== Filmography ==
- „Out Tonight“ – Video-clip (Adrian)
- „Winner Of Senats-Rockwettbewerb“ – Live video
- „Live im KOB“ – 10-minute-feature (Fishfinger-Productions)
- „1199“ – Guest appearance on former GDR television
- “Ska in Berlin” – ORB (Ostdeutscher Rundfunk Brandenburg television station) – Report on Blechreiz’s 10th anniversary
- „Berlin-Warzawa“ – Live video of the Friendship Concert in Warsaw, Poland filmed by Polish TV 1 television station
- „Which Side Are You On?“ – Television documentary (Arte/Yildiz Film)
