= Chaver (title) =

Hebrew term meaning "associate"; "colleague"; "fellow"; "companion"; "friend"

Chaber, chaver or ḥaber (Hebrew: חָבֵר ḥāḇēr, Hebrew pronunciation: [χaˈveʁ]) is a Hebrew term meaning "associate"; "colleague"; "fellow"; "companion"; or "friend". It appears twice in the Hebrew Bible, and is used in various ways in rabbinic sources.

== Hebrew Bible ==
The word appears twice in the Hebrew Bible (Psalms 119:63, Proverbs 28:24), meaning "companion".

== A friend ==
The term is ordinarily used in rabbinical texts in its Biblical sense of "companion". A Talmudic proverb says, "Your chaber has a chaber, and your chaber's chaber has a chaber", meaning that words spoken in front of a few people can be presumed to circulate and become public.

== A scholar ==
The rabbis strongly recommended study in company, asserting that only in this way can knowledge be acquired; therefore, if necessary, one should even expend money for the purpose of acquiring a companion. A prominent teacher of the second century declared that, while he had learned much from his masters, he had learned more from his "chaberim". Hence the term came to mean a "companion in study," a "colleague". In the form talmid-haver or haver-talmid, it denotes one who is at once the student and colleague of a certain teacher, a scholar who from being a student has risen to be a colleague or fellow. Eventually "chaber" assumed the general meaning of "scholar", and appears as a title lower than hakham.

In the medieval period, the title "chaber" was known in the 11th century, when it probably referred to a member of a court of justice; but in Germany in later centuries it indicated that its possessor had devoted many years to the study of sacred literature. In some communities, particularly originating from Germany, this title is still used today. There is also a program organized by the Orthodox Union to bestow this title.

In congregational life it was conferred as a rule on married men, but often also on yeshiva graduates who were single. Rabbi Moshe Lifshitz conferred it on the Christian professor Tychsen.

== Purity laws ==
"Chaber" also denotes a member of a society or order ("chaburah," "chaburta," "k'neset" = "aggregation," "company," "union"), or of a union of Pharisees, for the purpose of carrying out the observance of the laws of food purity to their fullest possible development. In their eyes, any person whose observance of the food purity or tithing laws was doubtful was an am ha'aretz, whose contact was defiling. The term "chaber" is not synonymous with "Parush" (Pharisee), since not all Pharisees were chaberim, though sometimes the generic term "parush" is used instead. Occasionally, the more specific term "ne'eman" (trustworthy) takes the place of "chaber".

On the Scriptural verse, "He shall... purify and sanctify it" the rabbis taught the maxim, "Purity leads to sanctity". This purity was understood to be closely connected with Levitical purity; of this there were several degrees, there being sections in the community which observed its rules more strictly and extensively than did others. Some even extended all the precautions necessary for the priest in eating holy things to the layman who lived on secular food.

=== Origin ===
The Bible requires the Israelite to give certain gifts from his farm and herd to the priest, Levite, and poor. The rules governing these gifts, as well as the rules of "clean" and "unclean," were doubtless familiar to the people at large; but not all people found it convenient or possible to comply with them. Their observance must have been particularly difficult in the unsettled state of affairs during the Maccabean wars. Some suggest that in this period the so-called "am ha'aretz" (who included the great majority of the people), either driven by circumstances or seduced by temptation, neglected them; and that a certain more rigorous minority, not knowing whom to trust in such matters, formed among themselves associations ("chaburot"), the members ("chaberim") of which pledged themselves to keep faithfully the rules of tithes and Levitical purity. Accordingly, the chaber is one who strictly observes these laws.

=== Admission ===
To be admitted as a chaber, one must declare his determination never to give terumah or ma'aser to a priest or a Levite who is classified as an am ha'aretz; nor to allow his ordinary food to be prepared by an am ha'aretz; nor to eat his ordinary food (chullin, grain and fruit from which terumah and ma'aser have been separated) except in a certain state of Levitical cleanness. This declaration must be made before three members of the order. If they are satisfied that the candidate has lived up to the rules in his private life, he is accepted at once; otherwise he is admitted as a "ben ha-k'neset" (son of the union, neophyte) for thirty days. According to Beit Shammai, this period suffices only when membership is sought for the lesser degrees of purity, while for the higher degrees the probation period lasts for a year. After this period, if the candidate has proved his constancy, he becomes a chaber or ne'eman. No distinction is made between the learned and the ignorant; all must make this declaration. The only exception is for a scholar attached to a college, on the presumption that he took the pledge when he first joined the college.

=== Degrees of chaburah ===
There are several classes of chaberim, corresponding to the several degrees of Levitical cleanness. The lowest class pledges itself to practise Levitical cleanness of "k'nafayim" (literally "wings"). This is a very obscure term, for which no satisfactory explanation has been found. It is generally assumed to mean "hands"; inasmuch as the Pharisaic maxim is, "Hands are always busy," unintentionally touching both clean and unclean things, they are regarded as being in a state of uncertain cleanness; hence one must cleanse them before eating anything Levitically clean. This may be legally accomplished by pouring on them one-fourth of a log of water. But that process suffices only where a person wishes to eat chullin, ma'aser, or terumah. If he desires to eat the sacrificial portions, he must dip his hands into forty seahs of water; and if about to handle the water of lustration, he must first subject his whole body to immersion.

As the ordinary Israelite and the Levite are not permitted to handle the most sacred things, it naturally follows that not all men are eligible for the higher degrees; and even of those whose descent does not bar their admission, not all are willing to assume the correspondingly greater precautions incident to the privilege. Provision is therefore made for general admission to the lower degrees, of which most people availed themselves. It is ordained that if one desires to join the order of chaberim, but does not wish to subject himself to the duties devolving upon the members of the higher degrees—the precautions necessary to keep himself Levitically clean, as for the more sacred things—he may be accepted; but where, on the contrary, one seeks admission to the higher degrees while refusing to pledge himself to strict observance of the rules governing the lower degrees, he must be rejected.

=== Separation from the am ha'aretz ===
Having been admitted as reliable in matters of ma'aser, a chaber must tithe what he eats, what he sells of his own produce, and what he buys for the purpose of selling, and must not eat at the table of an am ha'aretz, lest he be served untithed food. A full chaber must, in addition, not sell to an am ha'aretz anything that moisture would render subject to uncleanness, lest the am ha'aretz expose the goods to contamination; for rabbinical law forbids causing defilement even to secular things in the Land of Israel. Nor may he buy from an am ha'aretz anything exposed to moisture in that way, nor accept invitations to the table of an am ha'aretz, nor entertain one who is in his ordinary garments, which may have been exposed to defilement.

A chaber's wife, and his child or servant, have the same status as the chaber himself. Even after the chaber's death, his family enjoy this status, unless there is reason to doubt their fidelity. Even if they join the family of an am ha'aretz, they are presumed to continue their observant habits, unless there is reasonable suspicion to the contrary. Similarly, family members of an am ha'aretz joining the family of a chaber are not considered trustworthy unless they pledge themselves to live up to the rules of the chaburah. (An exception to these rules is a child or servant of either group who enters a household of the other group for the purpose of study: he then receives the status of the house.) If a man is recognized as reliable while his wife is not (as when a chaber marries the widow or daughter of an am ha'aretz), chaberim may buy food from him, but must not eat in his house if it is presided over by his wife. If, however, the wife is reliable (being the widow or daughter of a chaber) and the husband is an am ha'aretz, chaberim may eat at his table, but must not buy from him.

=== Suspension from the order ===
The status of chaber continues indefinitely, unless one is reasonably suspected of backsliding. In that case, he is suspended from the chaburah until he reestablishes his trustworthiness. Similarly, where a chaber accepts an office that is considered suspicious (such as that of tax-collector or publican) he is suspended from the chaburah, but is reinstated upon leaving the office.

=== Date of origin ===
The exact date when the chaberim first appeared can not be determined. It is unlikely that the chaburah concept existed in pre-Maccabean days, or that it is identical to the "great congregation of priests" (I Maccabees 14:28), since in the later period of Persian rule over the Land of Israel, no great formative events are on record which could account for so great a separation from the body of the people. The precise period of the chaburah's organization should be sought, therefore, in the late second century BCE.

== See also ==
- Am ha'aretz
- Chavrusa
- Chavurah
- Demai
- Ma'aserot
- Pharisees
- Talmid Haver
