= Oluf Gerhard Tychsen =

German Orientalist, Semitologist and numismatist (1734–1815)

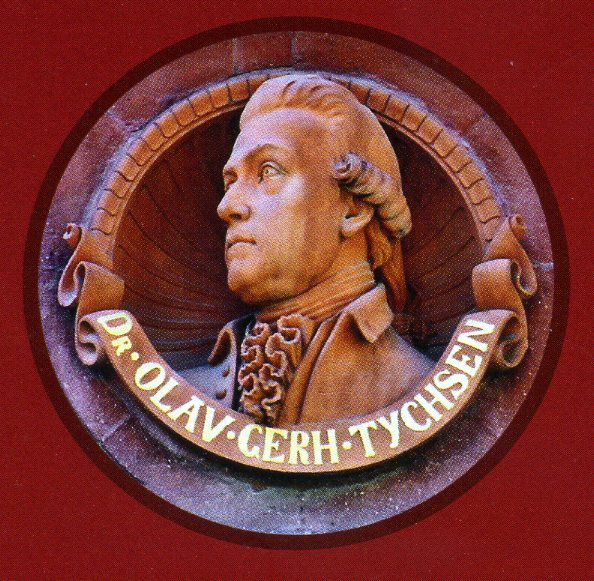
- Relief portrait of Tychsen at the University of Rostock
- Born: 14 December 1734; Tondern, Duchy of Schleswig
- Died: 30 December 1815 (aged 81); Rostock, Grand Duchy of Mecklenburg-Schwerin, German Confederation

Academic background
- Education: Martin Luther University Halle-Wittenberg

Academic work
- Discipline: Oriental studies; Semitic studies; numismatology
- Institutions: University of Bützow; University of Rostock

Oluf Gerhard Tychsen (Note: Tychsen's first name is also cited as Olof, Olaf, Olaus, Olaus, Olavus.) (14 December 1734 – 30 December 1815) was a German Orientalist, Semitologist, numismatist, professor and librarian. He is known today as one of the founding fathers of Islamic numismatology.

== Early life and education ==
Tychsen was born on 14 December 1734 in Tondern, Duchy of Schleswig (present-day Tønder, Denmark) to Jürgen Tychsen (died 1780), a tailor and non-commissioned officer, and Hanna Tychsen (née Gerhardsen; 1707–1780).

In 1745, Tychsen began studying at a local Latin school before being awarded a scholarship to study at the Gymnasium Christianeum in 1952. Tychsen also attended the rabbinic school attached to the Altona Ashkenazi synagogue, led by Jonathan Eybeschütz, chief rabbi of the Triple Community of Altona-Hamburg-Wandsbek.

Initially enrolling at the University of Jena in 1755, Tychsen transferred to the Martin Luther University Halle-Wittenberg the following year; studying theology, oriental languages, philosophy and history until 1757.

== Career ==
He spent a year of missionary work towards the conversion of Jews, and then taught Hebrew in the newly founded University of Bützow. He held librarian and academic positions in University of Bützow There he founded the Journal Bützower Nebenstunden, which comprised a broad variety of articles about the Old Testament and Oriental Culture, especially material culture, such as Islamic coins.

From 1778 he taught at the University of Rostock and led the Rostock University Library. He worked in different fields of Oriental studies, Arabic, Syriac, and Hebrew. His Introduction into Islamic Numismatics, in 1794, was the first scientific handbook on this topic, based on twenty-seven years of research. Among his students were Christian Martin Frähn, later professor at the University of Kazan and later founder of the Asiatic Museum in Saint Petersburg, and Christian Adler, who wrote the first scientific catalogue of a collection of Islamic coins and later became superintendent for Schleswig-Holstein. He was a prolific author who published some forty volumes of scholarly studies during his academic career. He received the title of Chaver, a grade of rabbinic ordination, from Moshe Lifshitz, becoming the only known non-Jew to have done so.

== Personal life ==
Tychsen adhered to Lutheran orthodoxy.

On 30 December 1815, Tychsen died in Rostock, Grand Duchy of Mecklenburg-Schwerin (present-day Germany) aged 81.

== Memberships ==
- since 1791: Royal Society of Sciences in Uppsala
- since 1792: Accadenia Letteraria Volsca Veliterna (Società letteraria dei Volsci), Velletri
- since 1793: Royal Swedish Academy of Letters, History and Antiquities, Stockholm
- since 1796: Galileiana Academy of Arts and Science, Padua (corresponding)
- since 1798: Royal Danish Academy of Sciences and Letters
- since 1801: Mecklenburgian Society for Nature Research, Rostock
- since 1803: Royal Prussian Society of Sciences, Berlin
- since 1813: Royal Bavarian Academy of Sciences, Munich (corresponding)
- since 1815: Historical-Philological Class (department), University of Kazan (honorary corresponding)
