= Chavrusa =

Talmudic study partnership

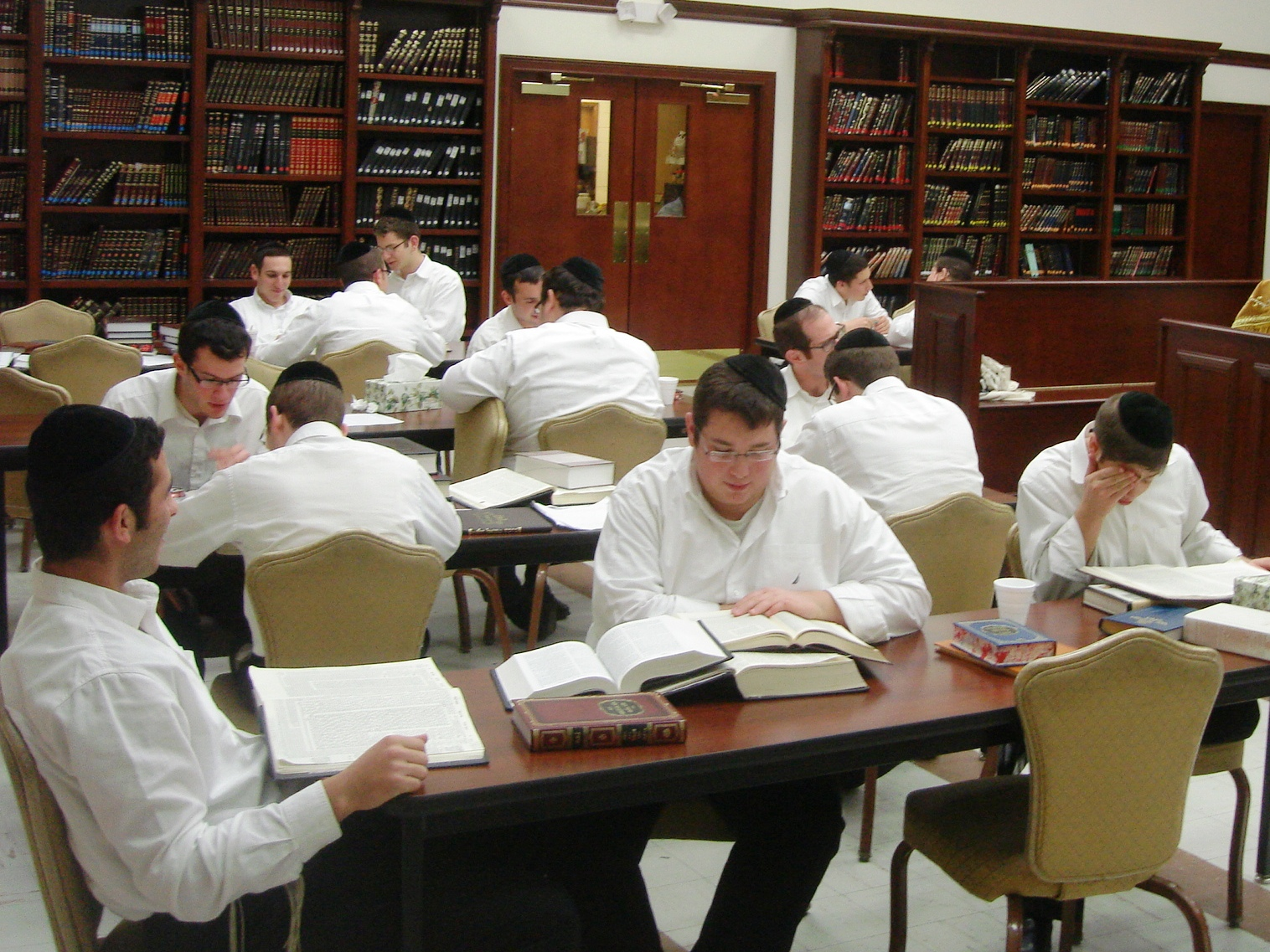
Khaveyrim (study partners) sit opposite each other or side by side in the beth midrash of Yeshiva Gedola of Carteret.

Chavrusa, also spelled chavruta or ḥavruta (Jewish Babylonian Aramaic: חַבְרוּתָא, romanized: ḥāḇruṯā, lit. 'fellowship'; pl.: חַבְרָוָותָא, ḥāḇrāwāṯā), is a traditional rabbinic approach to Talmudic study in which a small group of students (usually 2–5) analyze, discuss, and debate a shared text. It is a primary learning method in yeshivas and kollels, where students often engage regular study partners of similar knowledge and ability, and is also practiced by those outside the yeshiva setting, in work, home, and vacation settings. The traditional phrase is to learn b'chavrusa (בְחַבְרוּתָא bəḥāḇruṯā "in partnership"); the word has come by metonymy to refer to the study partner as an individual, though it would more logically describe the pair.

Unlike a teacher-student relationship, in which the student memorizes and repeats the material back in tests, chavrusa-style learning puts each student in the position of analyzing the text, organizing their thoughts into logical arguments, explaining their reasoning to their partner, hearing out their partner's reasoning, and questioning and sharpening each other's ideas, often arriving at entirely new insights into the meaning of the text.

== Definition ==
O chevra o mituta "Either friend or death". (In printings, "either chavruta or death.")

— Rava

Chavrusa is an Aramaic word meaning "friendship" or "companionship". The Rabbis of the Mishnah and Gemara use the cognate term chaver (חבר, "friend" or "companion" in Hebrew) to refer to the one with whom a person studies Torah. In contemporary usage, chavrusa is defined as a "study partnership".

A chavrusa usually refers to two students learning one on one. When three or more students learn together, they are called a chavura (Hebrew: חַבוּרָה, group; also chabura). In some communities, the idea of chavrusa can include two, three, four or even five individuals studying together. The Reform and Conservative movements have extended the idea of chavura to modern scholarship and poetry (note that a chavura (Ashkenazic pronunciation: chevra) can also refer to a group of individuals or families which is part study or prayer group, part social club). A (more formal) study group in a Yeshiva is sometimes referred to as a "Kibbutz" – see for example Sunderland Talmudical College § The Kibbutz – especially in older usage, preceding the use of that term for an agricultural community.

== Origin ==
"Just as a knife can be sharpened only on the side of another, so a disciple of a sage improves only through his chaver"

— Rabbi Hama b. Hanina

"Your chaver will make it [i.e., Torah study] solid in your hand. And do not rely on your own understanding"

— Rabbi Nehorai

Based on statements in the Mishnah and Gemara, chavrusa learning was a key feature of yeshivas in the eras of the Tannaim (Rabbis of the Mishnaic period, 10-220 CE) and Amoraim (Rabbis of the Talmudic period, 200 to 500 CE). The Rabbis repeatedly urged their students to acquire a study partner; for example, Rabbi Yehoshua Ben Perachia enjoined students to "Make for yourself a Rav and acquire for yourself a chaver", and Rabbi Yose ben Chalafta told his son Rabbi Abba that he was ignorant because he did not study with someone else. The choice of chavrusas seems to have been based on friendship or social proximity; thus, chavrusas fulfilled a social as well as an educational need.

While an individual may choose to study Talmud alone, it is strongly discouraged. In the Talmud, Jose bar Hanina is quoted as saying that "scholars who sit alone to study the Torah . . . become stupid" (Berakhot, 63b). Nevertheless, there is evidence that learning in pairs was not always a universal norm in yeshivas, for example in the famous Volozhin Yeshiva of 19th century Lithuania, there is evidence that individual study rather than studying in pairs was the norm.

Chavrusa-style learning is particularly suited to Talmud study, as the latter is a text filled with conflicting opinions and seemingly contradictory statements on principles of Jewish law. Besides tracking the back-and-forth debates, a student of Talmud must be able to analyze each opinion and present hypotheses to reconcile it in light of the others. The chavrusa relationship gives each student a platform to clarify and explain their position to a partner; then the two go on to question, defend, convince, amend, fine-tune, and even arrive at new conclusions through rigorous intellectual collaboration.

== Educational benefits ==
"With bar Lakisha, whenever I would say something, he would pose 24 difficulties and I would give him 24 solutions, and as a result [of the give-and-take] the subject became clear"

— Rabbi Yochanan on his chavrusa with Reish Lakish (Bava Metzia 84a)

Unlike conventional classroom learning, in which a teacher lectures to the student and the student memorizes and repeats the information back in tests, and unlike an academic seminary, where students do independent research, chavrusa learning challenges the student to analyze and verbally explain the material, point out the errors in his partner's reasoning, and question and sharpen each other's ideas, often arriving at entirely new insights into the meaning of the text.

A chavrusa helps the student stay awake, keep his mind focused on the learning, sharpen his reasoning powers, develop his thoughts into words, and organize his thoughts into logical arguments. This type of learning also imparts precision and clarity into ideas that would otherwise remain vague. Having to listen to, analyze and respond to another's opinion inculcates respect for others. It is considered poor manners to interrupt one's chavrusa. The chavrusa relationship also strengthens the student's personal commitment to his studies, as he is loath to disappoint or cancel on his chavrusa. Some early research has shown that the use of this study modality within a traditional Yeshiva education can aid students later succeed in law school -- although it remains an open question as to whether that relationship is causal or merely correlative.

== Practice ==
Chavrusa learning takes place in the formalized structure of the yeshiva or kollel, as well as in Talmudic study that an individual does at any time of day. Although a man skilled in learning could study certain topics on his own, the chavrusa relationship is preferred to help them crystallize their thoughts.

In the yeshiva setting, students prepare for and review the shiur (lecture) with their chavrusas during morning, afternoon, and evening study sessions known as sedarim. On average, a yeshiva student spends ten hours per day learning in chavrusa. Since having the right chavrusa makes all the difference between having a good year and a bad year, class rabbis may switch chavrusas eight or nine times in a class of 20 boys until the partnerships work for both sides. If a chavrusa gets stuck on a difficult point or needs further clarification, they can turn to the rabbis, lecturers, or a sho'el u'mashiv (literally, "ask and answer", a rabbi who is intimately familiar with the Talmudic text being studied) who are available to them in the study hall during sedarim. In women's yeshiva programs, teachers are on hand to guide the chavrusas.

Chavrusa learning tends to be loud and animated, as the study partners read the Talmudic text and the commentaries aloud to each other and then analyze, question, debate, and defend their points of view to arrive at a mutual understanding of the text. In the heat of discussion, they may wave their hands or even shout at each other. Depending on the size of the yeshiva, dozens or even hundreds of chavrusas can be heard discussing and debating each other's opinions. One of the skills of chavrusa learning is the ability to block out all other discussions in the study hall and focus on one's study partner alone.

== Choosing a chavrusa ==
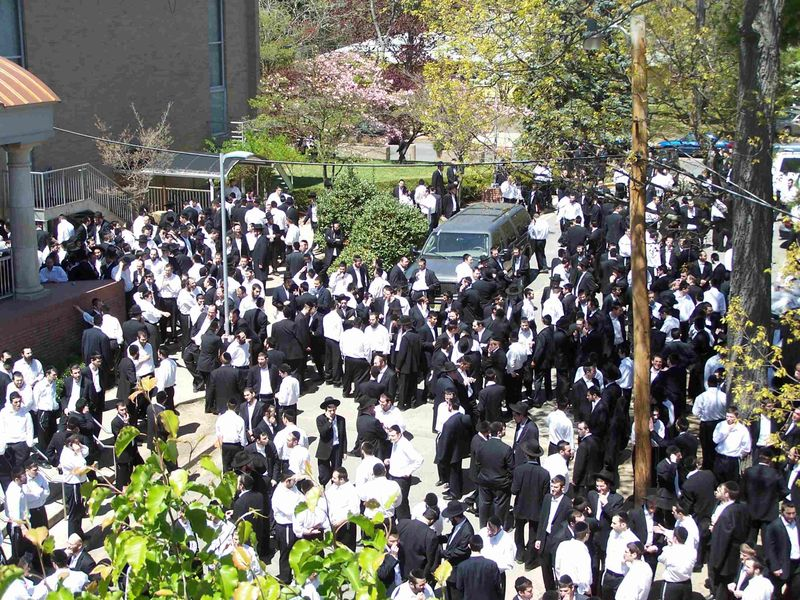
Tumult day in Beth Medrash Govoha

Pairing up study partners has been compared to making a shidduch (marriage match), as the skills, interests, temperament and schedule of each person must be taken into consideration. Good friends do not necessarily make good chavrusas. If the chavrusas spend too much time chatting or joking with each other at the expense of their study time, they are advised to find different study partners.

In the yeshiva world, the brightest students are highly desirable as chavrusas. However, there are pros and cons to learning with chavrusas who are stronger, weaker, or equal in knowledge and ability to the student. A stronger chavrusa will correct and fill in the student's knowledge and help them improve their learning techniques, acting more like a teacher. With a chavrusa who is equal in knowledge and ability, the student is forced to prove their point with logic rather than by right of seniority, which improves their ability to think logically, analyze other people's opinions objectively, and accept criticism. With a weaker chavrusa, who often worries over and questions each step, the student is forced to understand the material thoroughly, refine and organize their thoughts in a logical structure, present their viewpoint clearly, and be ready to justify each and every point. The stronger chavrusa helps the student acquire a great deal of information, but the weaker chavrusa helps the student learn how to learn. Yeshiva students are usually advised to have one of each of these three types of chavrusas in order to develop on all three levels.

Beth Medrash Govoha in Lakewood Township, New Jersey is known for its "tumult day" at the beginning of each z'man (semester), when thousands of students mingle outdoors with the goal of choosing a chavrusa for the new term. A similar "tumult day" takes place among the hundreds of students at the main Brisk yeshiva in Jerusalem, and at the Mir in Jerusalem.

Chavrusas often develop into lasting friendships. The shared commitment to scholarship and intellectual growth creates a close bond between study partners that has been said to be closer than that of many married couples.

== Women's chavrusas ==
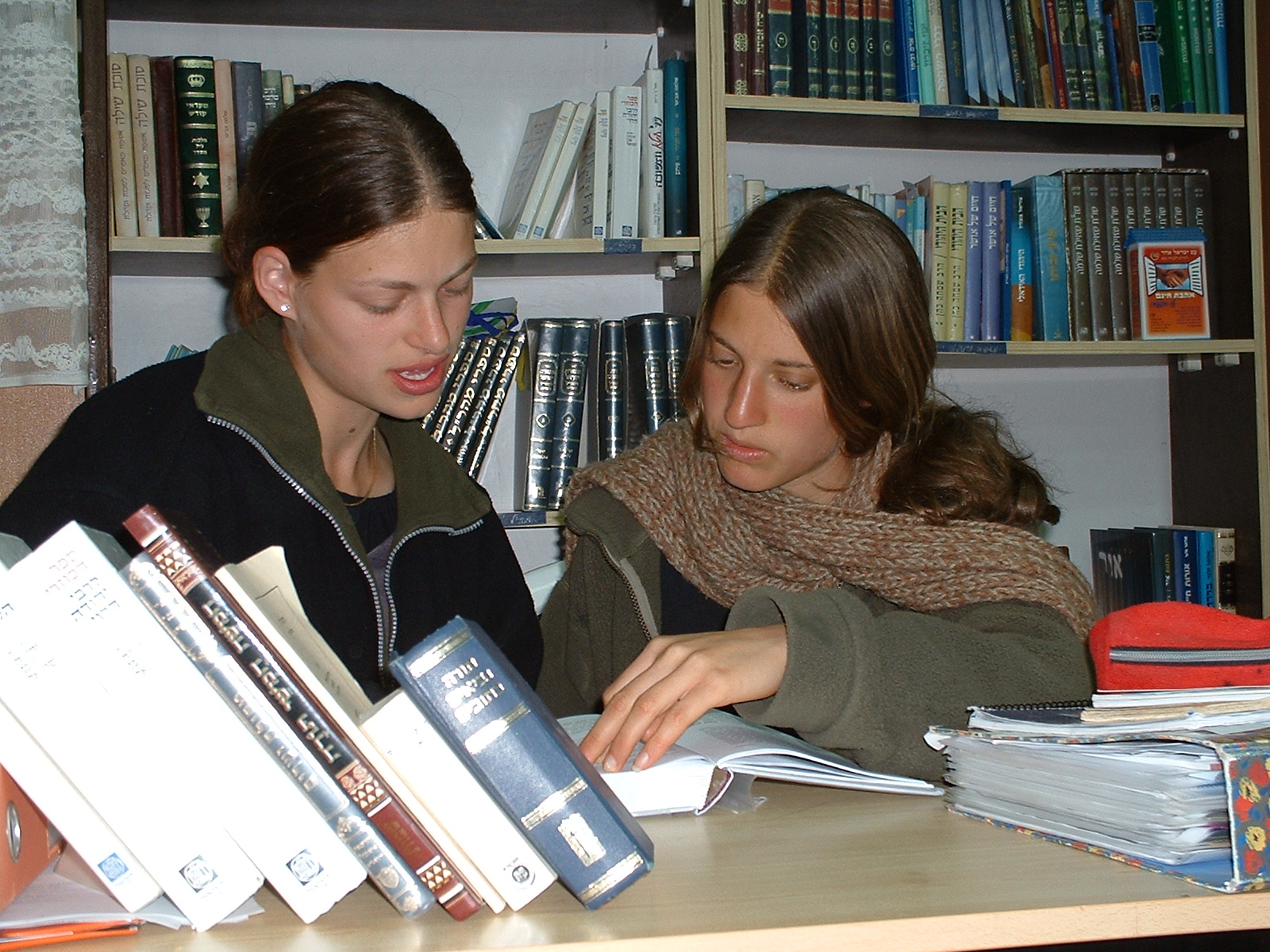
Women students engaged in chavrusa-style study at Midreshet Shilat in Israel

Women's yeshivas that include Talmud study on the curriculum often schedule chavrusa study sessions for their students. In Orthodox women's seminaries, students are paired with study partners of equal or greater strength to learn Halakha, Chumash, Jewish philosophy, or any other topic in Judaism.

In recent years, telephone study partnerships for women have been promoted as a kiruv (Orthodox Judaism outreach) tool in Israel and as an option for busy homemakers.

Yosef Chaim Sonnenfeld, Chief Rabbi of Mandatory Palestine, reportedly had a regular half-hour chavrusa with his wife, during which they studied Orach Chayim.

== Telephone and online chavrusas ==
How to create a lesson on the phone of learning mishna

In 1997, Partners in Torah was the first organization to move chavrusa-style learning out of the yeshiva and synagogue and into telephone study sessions. During the 2000s, many free Internet services began matching up study partners around the world using videoconferencing and Skype hook-ups.

=== Telephone chavrusas ===
- TorahMates, a free chavrusa program of national nonprofit Oorah, offers to partner knowledgeable volunteers with students with weaker backgrounds to study any Jewish topics of their choice, with coordinators on staff to ensure the partnership works well.
- Partners in Torah — founded in 1991 as a one-on-one study program for Jewish day school parents under the umbrella of Torah Umesorah, the National Society for Hebrew Day Schools. The program initially offered only in-person learning but added telephone study partnerships in 1997. As of 2017, over 72,000 men and women from 2,337 cities in 39 countries had participated in weekly telephone study partnerships. In 2016, Partners in Torah became an independent organization.
- Jnet — founded in 2006, this project of Merkos L'Inyonei Chinuch pairs men and women with Chabad volunteers for Jewish learning

=== Online chavrusas ===
- Chavrusamatch — launched by a Baltimore Torah educator in 2012, this service matches both men and women with local or global study partners online, via telephone, or video chat
- D.A.F. Online Chavrusa Database — provides online postings of people looking for a chavrusa, a teacher, or a student
- International Chevruta Exchange – connects learning partners via online videoconferencing or teleconferencing, along with a mentor who can answer questions on the material being studied
- Israeli Chavruta Initiative — a project of Yeshivat Hesder Nahar-Deiah of Nahariya
- Online Chavrusa — connects study partners via Skype
- Project Zug – matches students in a chavrusa based on their course preferences given at the time of registration, or offers them to join with a friend, and provides source sheets and guidance
- The Virtual Chavruta — provides tutors via videoconferencing
- TorahMates — a project of Oorah, provides chavrusas at home, by phone, and online, and also provides the learning materials free of charge
- WebYeshiva — founded in 2007, this service offers online yeshiva and chavrusa learning
- The Pearl Matlin Lev L'Lev Program — Partners in Torah for Children & Adults with Special Needs, via Skype or over-the-phone.

== Limmud Chavruta Project ==
Founded in the United Kingdom in 1996 and launched globally in 2009, the Limmud Chavruta Project produces an annual study guide for chavrusa-style learning. The study guides, which include source texts on topics such as "Responsibility", "Creativity", "Time", and "Money", are issued in conjunction with the British-Jewish educational charity's annual conference.

== Other uses ==
=== Zionist ideal ===
Zionist ideologue A. D. Gordon used the term chavrusa to refer to a communal society, such as the moshav, kibbutz, or worker's association, which acts as a self-educational link to the larger social-educational process. In Zionist thought, the chavrusa is "a central tool in the struggle for the revival of the Jewish people, the revival of the individual, and the centrality of the idea of 'labor'. It is the highest expression of the Jewish person's extraordinary effort to recreate him or herself through 'labor', to be reconnected to nature, and to plant the many-branched tree of his or her nation in the land from which it was uprooted".

=== Chavrusa magazine ===
Chavrusa is the name of the magazine of the Rabbinic Alumni of the Rabbi Isaac Elchanan Theological Seminary, published since the late 1950s.

=== Havruta magazine ===
Havruta magazine is a publication of the Pardes Institute of Jewish Studies.

== See also ==
- Chaber
- Talmid Haver
- Torah study
- Pair programming
