= Jacob Georg Christian Adler =

Jakob Georg Christian Adler
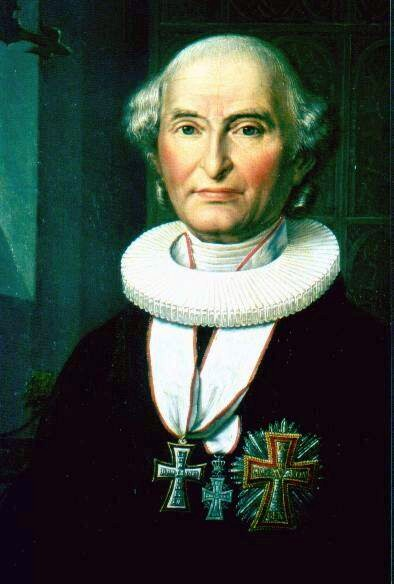
- Contemporary image of Jakob Georg Christian Adler (unknown artist)
- Born: 8 December 1756; Arnis, Schleswig
- Died: 22 August 1834 (aged 77); Giekau, near Lütjenburg
- Known for: Syriac studies, Oriental studies, Lutheran theology

Academic background
- Education: University of Kiel; University of Bützow; University of Rostock
- Academic advisor: Oluf Gerhard Tychsen

Academic work
- Institutions: University of Copenhagen

Jakob Georg Christian Adler (8 December 1756 – 22 August 1834) was a Danish-German General Superintendent for Holstein and Schleswig, Orientalist, Syriac language professor at the University of Copenhagen, Lutheran theologian, senior consistory councilor book writer, religious educator, coin collector and head of the Schleswig-Holsteinische Bibelgesellschaft.

== Biography ==
Jacob Georg Christian Adler was the son of Georg Christian Adler and a relative of Caspar Aquila and Matthias Claudius. Adler received private education from his father and attended the Christianeum Hamburg. Then he studied theology at the University of Kiel and oriental studies under Oluf Gerhard Tychsen at the University of Bützow and Rostock. He wrote several books on Syriac language and ancient Arabian language, about a long stay in Rome etc.

== Work ==
- Beschreibung der Stadt Rom. Kiel: Carl Ernst Bohn 1781 (published by his brother)
- Reise nach Rom. Altona 1783
- Sammlung v. gerichtlichen jüdischen Contrakten. Hamburg u. Bützow 1773, 2. Aufl., Altona 1792
- Judæorum codicis Sacri rite scribendi leges, ad recte æstimandos codices manuscriptos antiquos perutiles; e libello Thalmudico מסכת ספרים in Latinum conversas. Hamburg 1779
- Faksimilia kufischer Koranhandschriften der Kgl. Bibliothek in Kopenhagen mit einer Untersuchung über die arabischen Schriftentwicklung. Kopenhagen 1780
- Museum Cuficum Borgianum Velitris, Bd. I. Rom 1787, Bd. II, Kopenhagen 1792
- Novi testamenti versiones Syriacae, simplex Philoxeniana et Hierosolymitana. Kopenhagen 1789
- Annalen des Abulfida – Herausgeber des von J. J. Reiske bearbeiteten u. übersetzten Werkes (5 Bde.). Kopenhagen 1789–95

== Literature about Adler ==
- August Hennings (?): "Schleswig-Holsteinische Kirchen-Agende". In: Der Genius der Zeit 13 (1798), S. 369–375
- H[ennings]., A[ugust].: "Einladung zur Aufmerksamkeit auf einen geheimen, und iezt vielleicht noch allgemein unerkannt gebliebenen Grund der Agende {Streitigkeiten in den Herzogthümern Schleswig und Holstein}". In: Der Genius der Zeit 15 (1798), S. 1–7
- H[ennings]., A[ugust].: "Schleswig Holsteinische Kirchenagende". In: Der Genius der Zeit 15 (1798), S. 404–405
- "Die Vorfahren des Generalsuperintendenten A.", in: Schriftenreihe des Vereins f. schleswig-holsteinische Kirchengeschichte, Rh. 2, Bd. 5, 1910–13; S. 213 ff.
- Anton Baumstark: Geschichte der syrischen Literatur [...] 1922; S. 144
- O. F. Arends: Gejstligheden i Slesvig og Holsten fra Reformationen til 1864 – Personalhistoriske Untersogelser. Kopenhagen 1932
- Dansk biografisk Leksikon, Bd. I. 1933; S. 129 ff.
- F. Rosenthal: Die aramaistischen Forschungen seit dem 20. Jhd. – Nöldeke's Veröffentlichungen. Leiden 1939; S. 144 f.
- Joh. W. Fück: Die arabischen Studien in Europa bis in den Anfang des 20. Jhd., 1955; S. 218 (Fn. S. 557)
- Allg. Deutsche Biographie (55 Bde. und 1 RBd.). Leipzig 1875–1912; Bd. I, S. 85 f.
- Neue Deutsche Biographie. Berlin 1953 ff.; Bd. I, S. 70 f.
- Kurt Galling (Hrsg.): Die Religion in Geschichte und Gegenwart – Handwörterbuch für Theologie und Religionswissenschaft (6 Bde.). Tübingen 1957–1962; RBd. 1965, Teil I, S. 96 f.
- Walter Kasper et al. (Hrsg.): Lexikon für Theologie und Kirche, 3. Aufl. Freiburg 1993 ff.; Bd. I, 148 f.
- Dictionnaire d'histoire et de géographie ecclésiastiques. Paris 1912 ff.; Bd. I, S. 573
- Dr. Werner Aquila: Die Nachfahren Leonhard Adlers später Aquila aus Augsburg. Sonderdruck des Genealogischen Jahrbuches (hrsgg. von der Zentralstelle für Personen- und Familiengeschichte, Bd. 44. Neustadt/Aisch: Verlag Degener & Co. 2004)
