= Arnis, Germany =

Arnis Arnæs
- Town
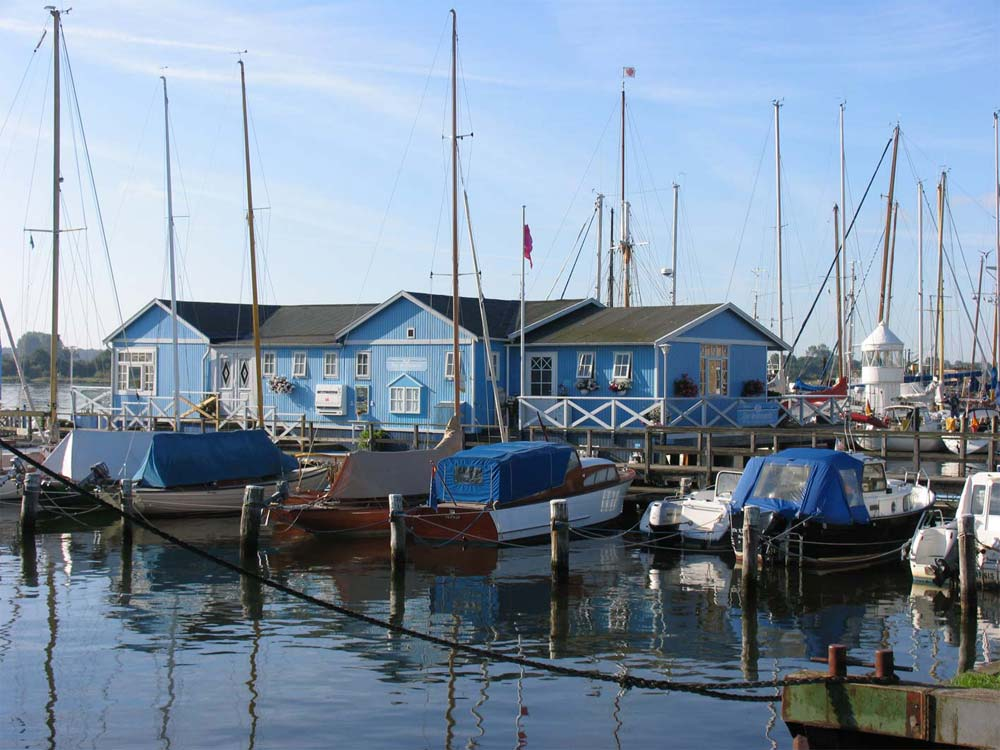

- Flag Coat of arms

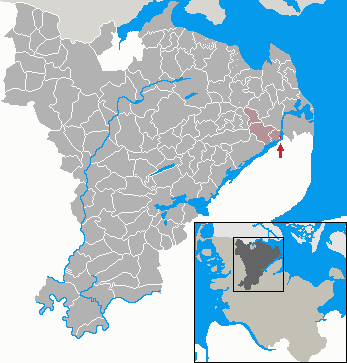
- Location of Arnis; Arnæs within Schleswig-Flensburg district
- Interactive map of Arnis; Arnæs
- Location within Germany Location within Schleswig-Holstein
- Coordinates: 54°37′48″N 09°55′53″E
- Country: Germany
- State: Schleswig-Holstein
- District: Schleswig-Flensburg
- Municipal assoc.: Kappeln-Land

Government
  - Mayor: Jens Matthiesen

Area
  - Total: 0.45 km^{2} (0.17 sq mi)
- Elevation: 2 m (6.6 ft)

Population (2025-12-31)
  - Total: 258
  - Density: 570/km^{2} (1,500/sq mi)
- Time zone: UTC+01:00 (CET)
  - Summer (DST): UTC+02:00 (CEST)
- Postal codes: 24399
- Dialling codes: 04642
- Vehicle registration: SL
- Website: www.arnis.de

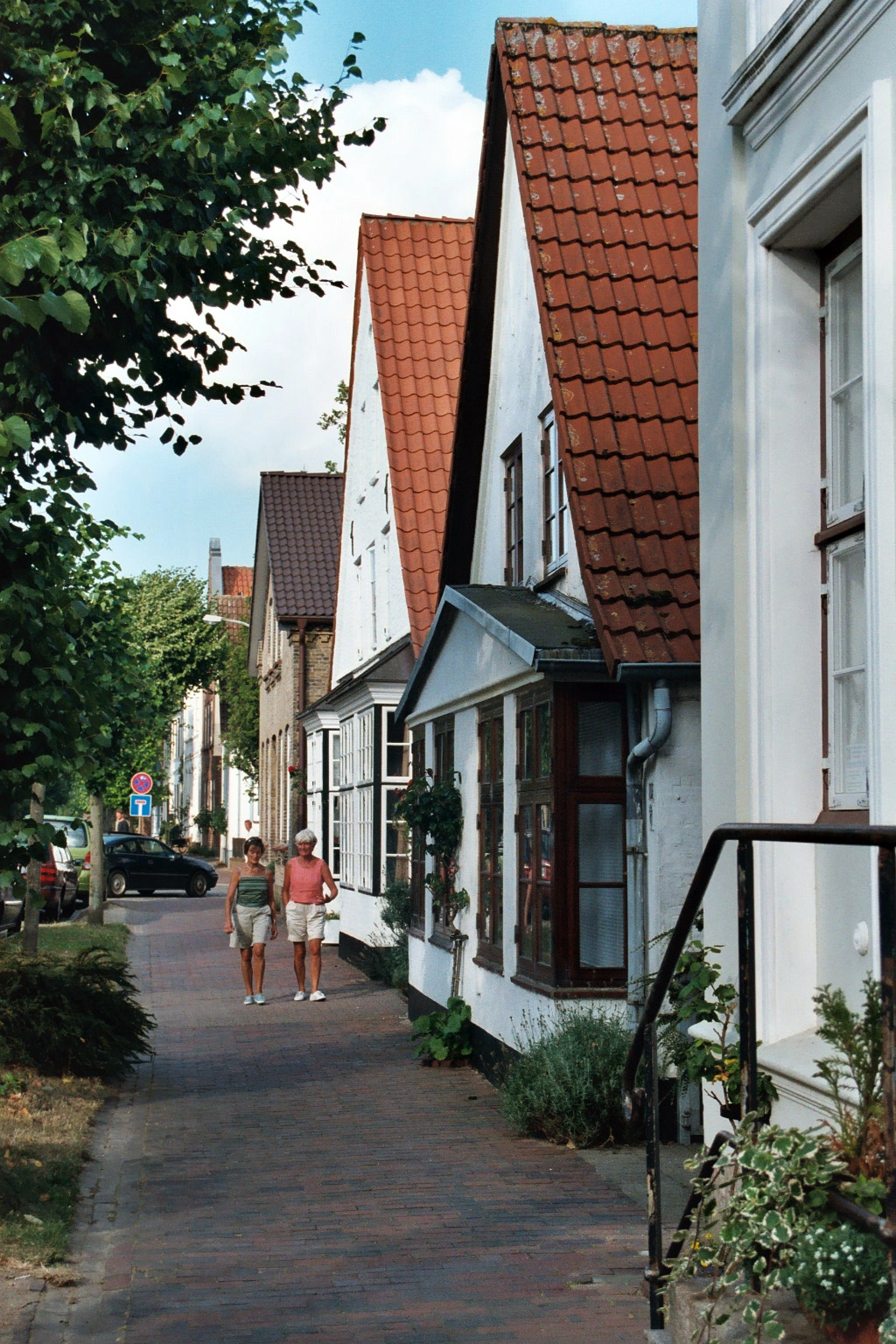
Arnis town

Arnis (German: [ˈaʁnɪs]; Danish: Arnæs) is the smallest town in Germany both by population and by area. At a population of c. 300 and a total area of 0.45 km^{2}, Arnis is part of the Amt Kappeln-Land in the district of Schleswig-Flensburg, in Schleswig-Holstein, Germany. It was founded in 1667 by shipping families from the nearby village Kappeln who wanted to avoid serfdom. The local Skipper's Church was erected in 1673. Originally Arnis was a skipper town with up to 90 sailing-ships (1864). In the late 20th century four shipyards were the basis of its economy. Today Arnis is a tourism showplace.

== History ==
Originally Arnis was a peninsula in the fjord-like Schlei. During the conflicts with the Counts of Schauenburg and Holstein and the Hanseatic League about the status of Schleswig the Danish king Eric of Pomerania ordered in 1415 the construction of two primitive castles in the Schlei, Schwonsburg and the opposite height of the today cemetery of Arnis. For better defence the isthmus between Arnis and Angeln was cut. Arnis became an island.

In 1666 the nobleman Detlef von Rumohr tried to press the families of the nearby village Kappeln into serfdom. They had fought before against this noble family and now asked the Duke Christian Albrecht to help them. Because Detlef von Rumohr was an ally of the Danish King Duke Christian Albrecht responded positively – he hoped to debilitate a political enemy. Kappeln skippers were successful, so he also hoped to establish a new prosperous port on his land and offered the island of Arnis as the place for a new settlement. To support this project he granted a charter of twenty privileges („Arnisser Privileg“) to the families of Kappeln.

On 11 May 1667 65 families from Kappeln gathered on the island Arnis to administer the oath to Duke Christian Albrecht. Detlef von Rumohr reacted with a dual strategy, he resigned the plan to force the Kappeln inhabitants into serfdom but put pressure on the emigrants. In the end only 30 houses were built in Arnis and the new settlement faced a crisis during the Scanian War and the following conflicts between Holstein-Gottorp and Denmark. In Arnis for some years more people died than were born. When Christian Albrecht's son, Frederick IV., offered a new 11 years tax exemption for new settlers Arnis began to grow and became in the late 18th and during the 19th century a prosperous skippers place with up to 1000 inhabitants and almost 90 sailing ships (1864).

Arnis skippers and shipowners were together with those from Kappeln initiative to build a new estuary of the Schlei which actually was the duty of the city of Schleswig. Because state money was not sufficient for this ambitious project private money from both skipper communities led, after several setbacks, to a final success. Today „Schleimünde" is still based on the construction from the years 1794 to 1796. To push the project a skippers and shipowners society, the „Combinierte Schiffergesellschaft zu Kappeln und Arnis“ was founded. With having also a sailors association („Matrosengesellschaft“) Arnis stood out among German ports.

For centuries shipyards were typical of the economy in Arnis. The first documented construction of a ship was the „Hoffnung“ in 1728. With four shipyards in the second half of the 20th century the peak was reached. Matthiesen & Paulsen delivered sailing yachts to USA and Japan. Schiffswerft Otto Eberhardt had more than 40 employees – this shipyard closed in 2013. It reopened 2017 with new owners Henning and Peter Eberhardt.

== Arnis today ==
Yachting and tourism are the two main pillars for the economy of Germany's smallest town in the 21st century. The shipyards are focussing today on maintenance. They are still very important for the economy of the small town.

=== Celebration of the 350 Anniversary ===
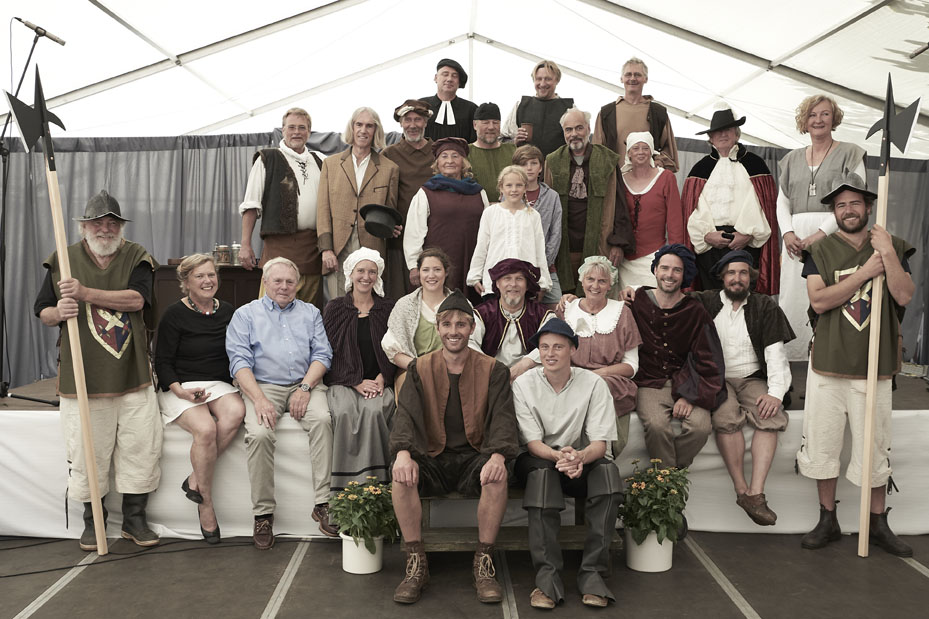
Group of actors for the play „Auszug nach Arnis“, Arnis 8th of July 2017

On the 8th of July Arnis celebrated in 2017 the 350th anniversary of its foundation with a pageant, a church service, a ceremonial act and many other activities. Some prominent politicians from Schleswig-Holstein participated the ceremonial act. Like 150 years before (200-year-anniversary) a theater group showed a play about the foundation of Arnis, Der Auszug nach Arnis.

=== Register of Cultural Monuments in Arnis ===
Among the cultural monuments in Arnis Skipper's Church, „Schifferkirche“ from 1673 and the oldest dwelling in Arnis, Lange Strasse 13, are well known. Among the works of art in Skipper's Church are the pulpit and the painting "The Erection of the Cross" worth seeing.

== Townscape ==
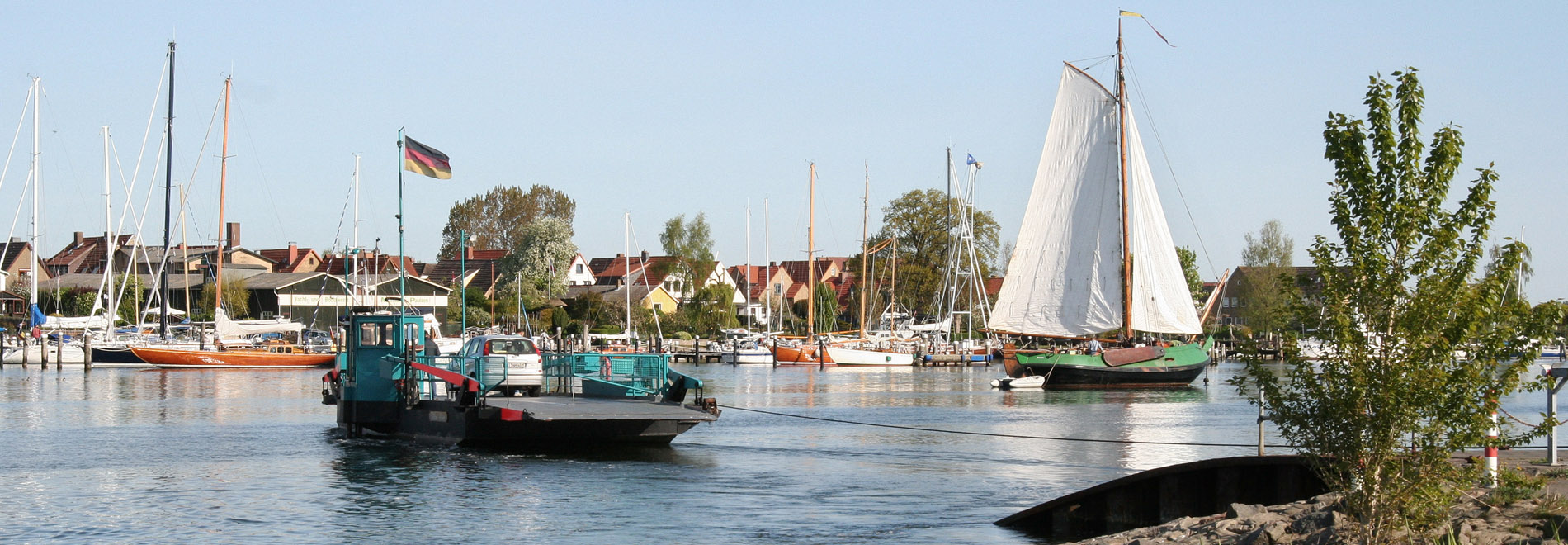
The Arnis ferry and a view from Sundsacker(2007)

== Notable people ==
- Jacob Georg Christian Adler, German Lutheran theologian
- Nicolaus Schmidt, artist and historian
- Friedrich Marquard Meyer (1769–1834), Danish theologian
- Johann Martin Graack (1816–1899), Danish artist

== Bibliography ==
- Nicolaus Schmidt: Arnis – 1667 2017 – Die kleinste Stadt Deutschlands, Wachholtz-Verlag 2017, ISBN 978-3-933862-49-5
