= Am ha'aretz =

"People of the Land" in the Tanakh

ʽAm haʼaretz (Hebrew: עם הארץ, romanized: ʿam hāʾareṣ, lit. 'people of the Land') is a term found in the Hebrew Bible and (with a different meaning) in rabbinic literature.

== Grammar ==
In Biblical Hebrew the word usually is a collective noun, but occasionally is pluralized as עמי הארץ amei ha-aretz "peoples of the land" or (in Late Biblical Hebrew) super-pluralized as עמי הארצות amei ha-aratzot "peoples of the lands". In Mishnaic Hebrew and later, the term refers to a single person: one such person is called an am ha-aretz, and multiple are amei ha-aretz. In Modern Hebrew the usual plurals are am ha-aretz and amei ha-aretz, but the super-plural amei ha-aratzot is occasionally used. In Yiddish and Yeshivish, it is often pluralized עמי הארצים amei ha-aratzim or עמרצים amaratzim.

== Tanakh ==
In the Tanakh, the term "the people of the land" refers to a special social group within the Kingdom of Judah.{ Morton Smith 1971:107} Among the activities of the biblical people of the land was the revolt against Athaliah. By contrast, the plural refers to foreigners, either the nations of the world or the native Canaanite population living in the Land of Israel.

In the Second Temple period, the people of the land are contrasted with those returning from the Babylonian captivity, "Then the people of the land weakened the hands of the people of Judah, and troubled them in building". It is unclear whether the term refers to the people of Judah who remained behind and adopted syncretistic views or to non-Hebrews. Rubenstein (2003) considers that in the Book of Ezra and Nehemiah, it designates the rural Jews who had remained in the land while the aristocratic and priestly classes were deported to exile in Babylonia. In the view of Magnar Kartveit (2009), the terms used in Ezra and Nehemiah may not be precise in their distinctions; there may be implication that the "people of the land" (Ezra 4:4) had intermarried with the "peoples of the lands" (Ezra 9:1 ammei ha'aretzoth), and there may be an equation or relation with the origin of the Samaritans.

== Rabbinic Judaism ==
In rabbinic literature, the term am ha'aretz designates a social stratum that did not adhere to the details of Jewish rabbinical law (halakha), though the sources do not present a coherent picture: some express hostility, while others indicate only measured, practical distancing. A minority of these sources can be dated to the late Second Temple period, while most belong to the Usha period, when rabbinic leadership relocated to Galilee in the aftermath of the Bar Kokhba Revolt. Some rabbinic texts treat the am ha'aretz as suspect regarding tumah and taharah (ritual purity), while others associate them with negligence in terumot and ma'asrot (priestly dues and tithes).

The am ha'aretz were of two types, the am ha'aretz le-mitzvot, Jews disparaged for not scrupulously observing the commandments, and the am ha'aretz la-Torah, those stigmatized as ignoramuses for not having studied the Torah at all.

The am ha'aretz are denounced in a very late and exceptional passage in Talmud Bavli Pesahim 49, where they are contrasted with the chachamim ("wise") and talmidei chachamim ("wise students", i.e. scholars of the Talmud). The text contains the rabbinical teaching that no man should marry the daughter of an am ha'aretz because if he should die or be exiled, his sons will then also be ammei ha'aretz (see Jewish matrilineality). A man should rather sell all his possessions in order to afford marriage to a daughter of a talmid chacham. Marriage of a talmid chacham to a daughter of an am ha'aretz is compared to the crossbreeding of grapevine with wild wine, which is "unseemly and disagreeable". The am ha'aretz is often contrasted with the chaber - a term used to describe someone scrupulous enough in Jewish law (namely laws of ritual purity and tithes) for an observant Jews of Second temple times to eat at their house. It too later evolved into a term to describe Torah knowledge - in this case a high degree of it.

According to Talmudist Yair Furstenberg, the Pharisaic tradition took a lenient approach towards ammei ha-aretz, considering them as Israelites impure in their conduct and dress but not in their persons, and therefore integrating rather than excluding them. This contrasts with the Qumran sect (widely identified with the Essenes) who rejected all Jews outside their movement and regarded only themselves as the true Israel, as reflected in their sectarian texts.

== See also ==
- Ger toshav "resident alien"
- Goy "non-Jew"
- Hellenistic Judaism
- Heresy in Judaism
- Negation of the Diaspora and the stereotype of the "Diaspora Jew"
- Sabra
- Who is a Jew?
- Zera Yisrael

== Sources ==
- Mayer Sulzberger, The Am Ha-aretz, The Ancient Hebrew Parliament: A Chapter In The Constitutional History Of Ancient Israel (1910)
- A'haron Oppenheimer, The ʻam ha-aretz: a study in the social history of the Jewish people in the Hellenistic-Roman period, vol. 8 of Arbeiten zur Literatur und Geschichte des hellenistischen Judentums, Brill Archive, 1977, ISBN 978-90-04-04764-8.
