= Nicolaus Schmidt =

German painter

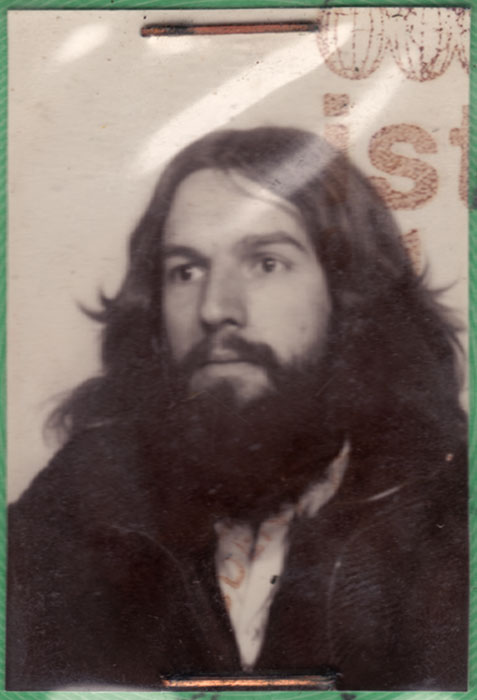
Nicolaus Schmidt 1974

Nicolaus Schmidt (born 1 January 1953) is a German artist, photographer and historian. He studied at the Hamburg Art Academy (HfBK) in the 1970s. In 1975, he founded ROSA, one of Germany’s first gay magazines. During the 1980s, he was a volunteer with the German branch of the children’s rights organization Terre des Hommes, serving for a time as its chairman. Since 1991, he has been living and making art in the Berlin neighborhood of Prenzlauer Berg.

== Public works ==
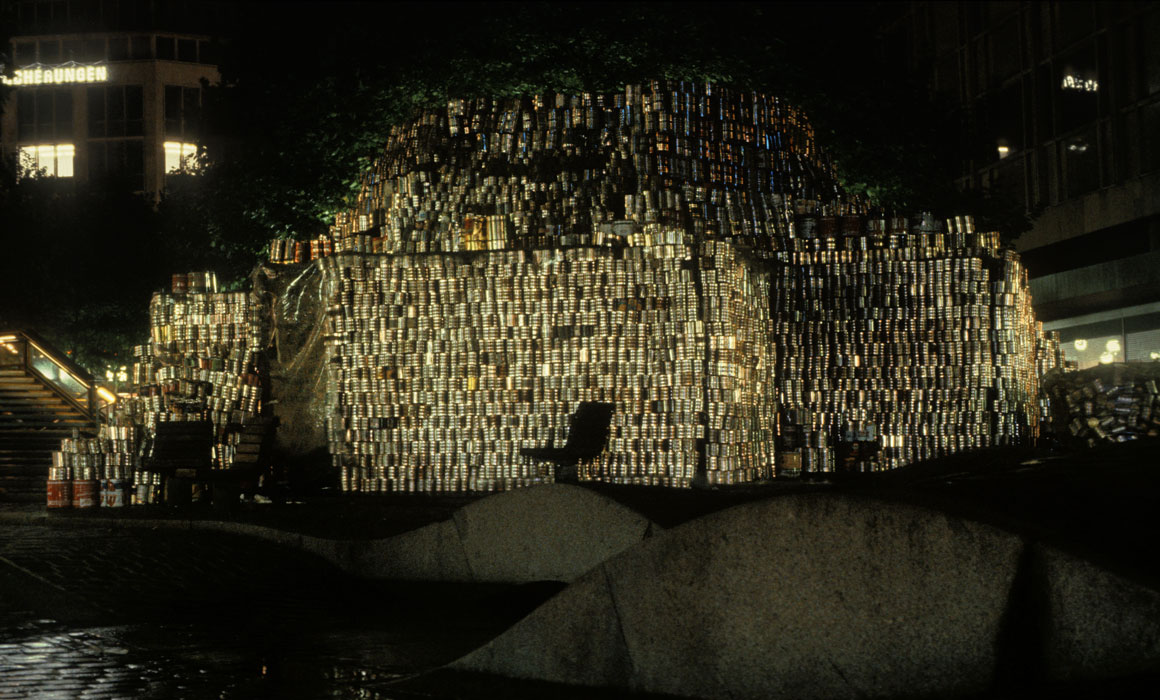
Cerro Rico Aktion, Hamburg 1982

Nicolaus was born Arnis, West Germany. In 1982, he created the Cerro Rico Aktion with 100,000 tin cans. In this work, the artist created an outdoor installation inspired by his interest in Third World affairs. Via public media, people were asked to collect tin cans so that the artist and his team could build a shining silver mountain (“Cerro Rico”) to symbolize the Bolivian mountain of the same name. This project called attention to the historical exploitation of South America’s wealth by European conquerors, and the use of child labor in the region. The Cerro Rico Aktion served as a prototype for many campaigns protesting conditions in the developing world.

In 2008, Schmidt and Christoph Radke presented RECONSTRUCCION! (Reconstruction) at the 10th Portes Obertes in El Cabanyal/Valencia, Spain.

With this performance/installation, the artists protested against the demolition of the architecturally and historically significant quarter. Despite their efforts, the area was partly destroyed shortly thereafter so that a new avenue can be built in the future. The conflict is still going on (2012).

== Photography and painting projects ==
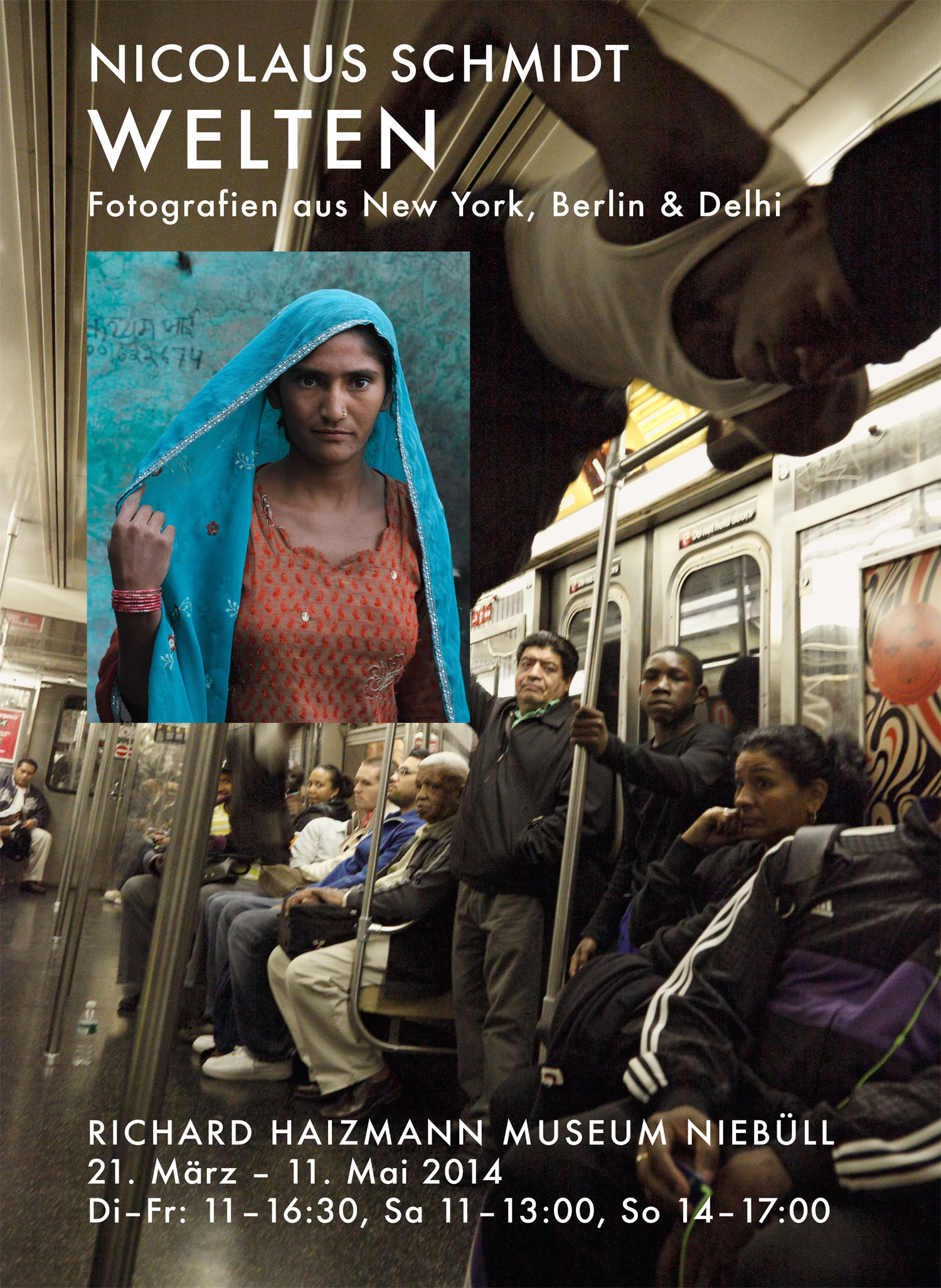
Nicolaus Schmidt WELTEN, poster Richard Haizmann Museum - Museum of Modern Art Niebüll

Since the end of the 1980s, Schmidt has been working on his “Morphograms,” anthropomorphic designs derived from the lines of the human body. The works start as drawings and are transformed into paintings and sculptures.

Another long-term project is the Kosmographie Gayhane, which Schmidt started in 2004. Gayhane is a successful Berlin nightlife event at the legendary SO36, offering Turkish gays and lesbians a place to meet. Schmidt’s Kosmographie is both documentary and fiction. It is a collection of fifty photographic portraits as well as illegible words written in an oriental-looking script.

Since 2007, the artist has been working on the New York Breakdancers Project (N.Y.P.B.). In a first show 2009 at Deutsches Haus/NYU he presents a series of large sized photographs tackling the subject of breakdance in urban space. "Nicolaus Schmidt’s photos are based on the idea of giving the dancers all the freedom to perform while the artist acts as a quasi-neutral observer". (Aboli Lion) In 2011 Nicolaus Schmidt portrayed New York b-boys in his book Breakin' the City. His pictures are a unique mixture of dance and architecture photography. This book marks the end of his breakdancers project.

In his book Astor Place, Broadway, New York, the photographer documents a barber shop where more than 50 hair stylists immigrated from all parts of the world are on work in the basement of an East Village building. Astor Place Hairstylists is one of the last stores remaining from the 1940s in Lower Manhattan. Nicolaus Schmidt captures the unique atmosphere of this living museum.

In 2015 the exhibition "Dignity and Strength - Photographs of Women in India" at the India International Centre in New Delhi was covered by several of the main Indian newspapers. Nicolaus Schmidt’s portrait-series reflect the situation of women, caught between tradition, religion and the modern age. The artist points at the contradictions in the relationship between women and men. The photographs reveal that even the poorest women are capable of displaying a surprising self-confidence.

In 2022 the second exhibition of Nicolaus Schmidt at the India International Centre – INDIA TECTON | Architectural Expressions in India – was inaugurated by the German ambassador Mr. Philipp Ackermann. The book and exhibition INDIA TECTON are the result of ten years of photographic research into the forms of Indian architecture. The artist shows a complex, multi-faceted, diverse history of India through its architecture.

On 13 May 2023, there was another INDIA TECTION exhibition of Nicolaus Schmidt which took place at Goethe-Institut Bangalore, in collaboration with the with Museum of Art & Photography, Bangalore.

== Bibliography ==
=== Art ===
- Nicolaus Schmidt, Breakin' the city, Kerber Verlag, Bielefeld, Germany, 2010/2011
- Nicolaus Schmidt, facebook: friends, edited by Michael W. Schmalfuss, Kerber Verlag, Bielefeld 2011, ISBN 978-3-86678-578-6
- Nicolaus Schmidt, Astor Place | Broadway | New York, editor Darnell L. Moore, Kerber Verlag, Bielefeld 2013, ISBN 978-3-86678-806-0
- Priyanka Dubey & Nicolaus Schmidt, INDIA • WOMEN, editor Doreet LeVitte Harten, Kerber Verlag, Bielefeld, 2014, ISBN 978-3-86678-990-6
- Nicolaus Schmidt: INDIA TECTON – Gebautes Indien / Architectural Expressions in India, editor: Kunststiftung K52, Deutscher Kunstverlag, Berlin, ISBN 978-3-422-98762-3

=== History ===
- Nicolaus Schmidt, Die Ausmalung des Kappelner Rathaussaales 1937 – die andere Seite der Biografie des Gerhart Bettermann, within: Kunstgeschichte, Open Peer Reviewed Journal, article, 2011
- Nicolaus Schmidt, Willi Lassen – eine biografische Skizze. within: Demokratische Geschichte. Bd. 26, Schleswig-Holsteinischer Geschichtsverlag, 2015,
- Nicolaus Schmidt: Arnis – 1667 2017 – Die kleinste Stadt Deutschlands, Wachholtz-Verlag 2017, ISBN 978-3-933862-49-5
- Nicolaus Schmidt: Viet Duc, German-Vietnamese Biographies: A Reflection of History / Deutsch-vietnamesische Biografien als Spiegel der Geschichte, Kerber Verlag, Bielefeld 2018, ISBN 978-3-7356-0484-2
