= SO36 =

Music club in Berlin, Germany

Coordinates: 52°30′01″N 13°25′20″E

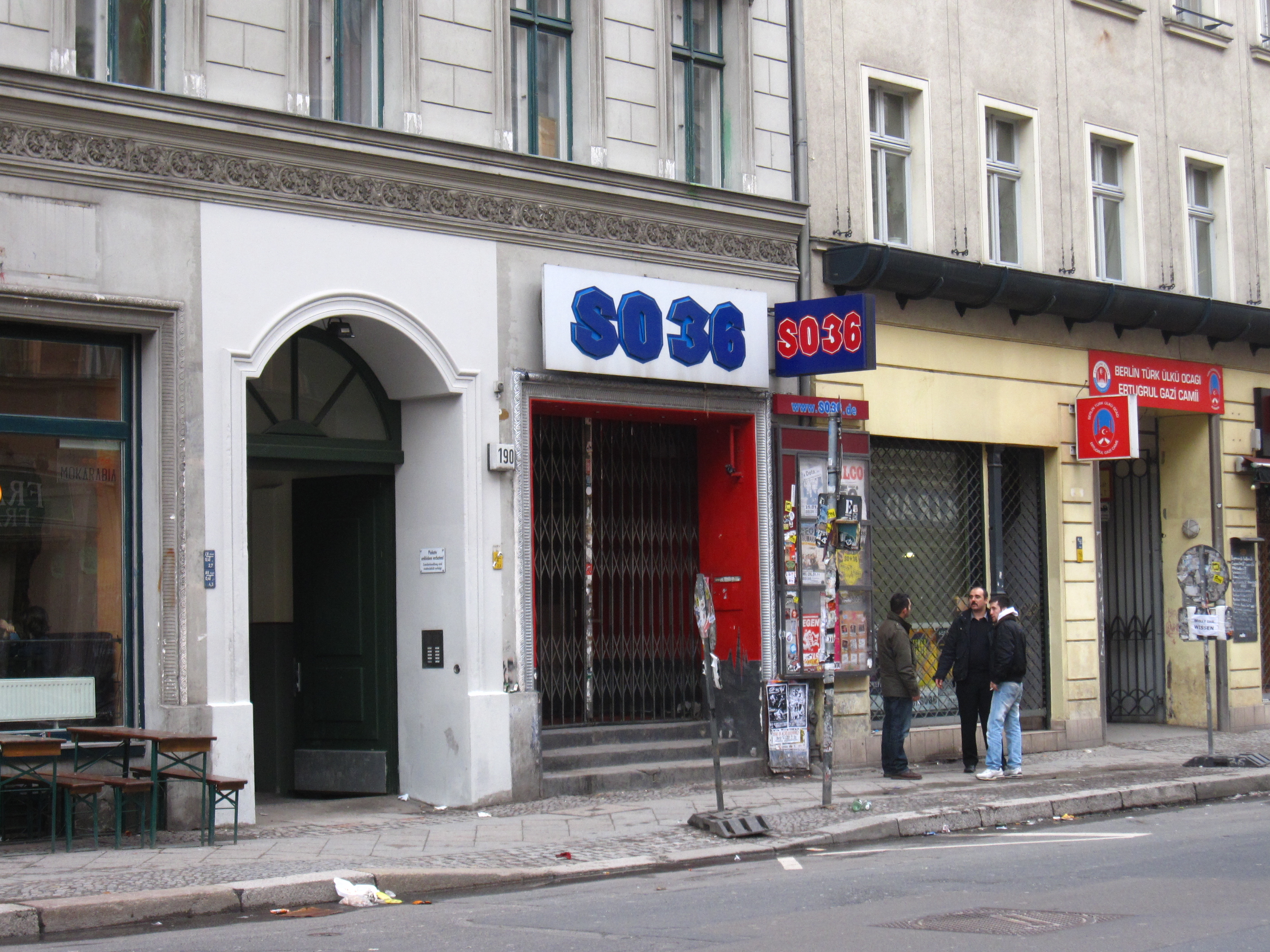
Entrance at Oranienstraße

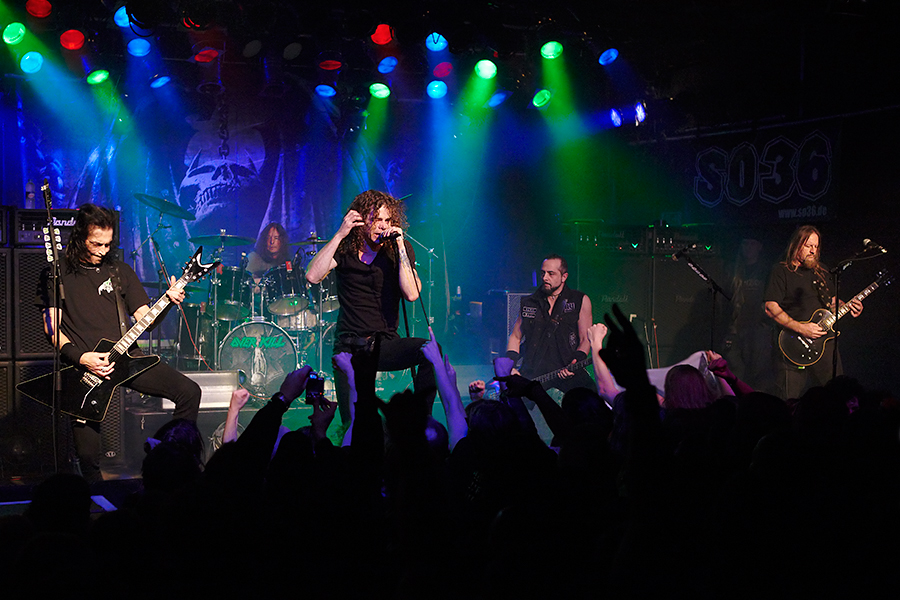
Overkill concert at SO36

The SO36 (German: [ʔɛsʔoːˌzɛksʔʊntˈdʁaɪ̯sɪç]) club is a music club on Oranienstraße near Heinrichplatz in the area of Kreuzberg in Berlin, Germany.

It takes its name from the historical postcode of that area, SO36, in which the SO stands for Südost (South East). The Kreuzberg district has historically been home to the Berlin punk rock movement, as well as other alternative subcultures in Germany.

== History ==
Since the 1970s SO36 has been a major venue for "alternative" music and culture. Many Punk greats have performed and still perform here. Martin Kippenberger took over the management in 1979, focusing on creating a crossover between Punk and other genres and mediums such as New Wave and the visual arts. SO36 has been compared to New York's CBGB as one of the finest new-wave venues in the world. However unlike CBGB the venue still stands as of March 2023, and remains a fixture on the Berlin music scene championing new artists, while staying true to its Punk roots. In 2016, the club released SO36: 1978 bis heute ("1978 through today"), a retrospective illustrated book covering the 36-year history of the club, for €36.

== Notable cultural connections ==
English rock band Killing Joke named a song $.O.36 on their eponymous first album, but it is unclear if the song was based on the postal code or the club. The Electric Ballroom held at the club is considered a legendary fixture of the Berlin techno gay scene. Gayhane founded 1997 by Turkish performer Fatma Souad is the nucleus of the Berlin Turkish gay and lesbian community. DJ Ipek, an internationally known DJ and performer at the club, is responsible for the Gayhane mixture of Arabic, Turkish and Indian music. German photographer Nicolaus Schmidt created both a documentary and fictitious portrait of the club, called an "amalgam of western and oriental culture". Alternative folk/rock band New Model Army recorded their 2025 live double album and DVD, Live SO36 at the venue.
