= Johann Martin Graack =

Johann Martin Graack (4 November 1816 – 12 January 1899) was a Schleswig portrait painter, lithographer and photographer.

== Life ==
Graack was born in Arnæs in Schleswig. He was the son of mate Ditlef Lorenz Graack and Anna Christina Jeger. He learned to draw with the painter G. Lorenzen in his hometown, later apprenticed with the same painter, and visited the Academy of Fine Arts from October 1836 to October 1844, where he obtained the recommendations of Johan Ludwig Lund and CW Eckersberg. He exhibited 6 times at the Charlottenborg Spring Exhibition in the period 1838–1846 (with 19 portrait drawings).

In his youth, Graack drew perspectives from Southern Jutland, which were lithographed by JF Fritz in Flensburg, but otherwise mainly executed portraits. A few paintings include one of Pastor Iversen (1840, Enge Kirke) and portraits of the teachers at Skårup Seminarium Ditlev Petersen, Justus Fr. Andreas Posselt, Carl Simonsen and the superintendent Didrik August Holberg, which are now known only through his lithographs.

He was a sought-after portrait lithographer whose sitters included Frederik VI (1836), then later Duke Frederik Christian August of Augustenborg and Duke Carl of Glücksborg, in addition to a number of officials who were connected to the duchies. He is represented in the Kobberstiksamlingen, the Royal Library and the Frederiksborg Museum.

During a stay in Dresden, Graack learned to photograph and then practiced as a photographer in Kiel from 1863 to 1880. He died in Kiel in 1899.

== Literature ==
- Ulrich Schulte-Wülwer, Kieler Künstler, Bd. 1, Heide 2014, S. 228–235
- Nicolaus Schmidt, Johann Martin Graack, in: Nicolaus Schmidt, Arnis 1667–2017, Kiel 2017, S. 162.

== Other sources ==
- THC, "Johann Martin Graack", in: Merete Bodelsen and Povl Engelstoft (ed.), Weilbachs Kunstnerlexikon Copenhagen: Aschehoug 1947-52.
- Kirsten Nannestad, "Johann Martin Graack", in: Sys Hartmann (ed.), Weilbachs Kunstnerleksikon, Copenhagen: Rosinante 1994-2000.
- Nicolaus Schmidt, "Johann Martin Graack", Nicolaus Schmidt, Arnis 1667–2017 , Kiel: 2017, p. 162.
- Wikimedia Commons has more files related to Johann Martin Graack
- Johann Martin Graack on Kunstindeks Danmark / Weilbachs Kunstnerlexikon
