= Gymnasium Christianeum =

School in Hamburg, Germany

Coordinates: 53°33′28″N 9°52′24″E

Christianeum Hamburg
- Latin: Christianeum gymnasium academicum altonensis
- Motto: "Supernis Alimur Viribus"
- Type: Grammar school
- Established: 1738; 288 years ago
- Principal: Stefan Prigge
- Administrative staff: <100
- Students: 1078
- Location: Othmarschen, Hamburg, Germany
- Campus: Otto-Ernst-Strasse 34, Hamburg
- Website: christianeum.org

The Gymnasium Christianeum is a former Latin school (German: Lateinschule) in Hamburg, northern Germany. Founded in 1738 by King Christian VI of Denmark. It is now housed in a building planned by Danish designer Arne Jacobsen.

== History ==
The first Latin school here was founded as early as 1688 (according to other sources 1683) in Altona (now a part of Hamburg). Decades later the school acquired the status of a famous Gymnasium, the most famous in the duchy of Holstein, and was re-founded by Christian VI.

In 1738 the first eight students enrolled at the school. Over the following decades the school expanded and became an important educational institution in the region.

In 1816 King Frederik VI donated the Flora Danica to the library of the Christianeum. Sixteen years later the historian Theodor Mommsen attended the school. In 1902 Mommsen later received the Nobel Prize in Literature.

In the 20th century the school experienced major changes including the period of Nazi Germany and the destruction caused during World War II. The school resumed operations on 6 August 1945.

In 1964 a competition for designing a new school building was announced and Danish architect Arne Jacobsen was selected for the project. Construction of the new building started in 1968.

== Present ==
Today the Christianeum offers a broad curriculum including Latin, English, Ancient Greek, Russian, Spanish, French and Mandarin. The school also has a strong music department and participates in international student exchange programs.

== Notable alumni ==
- Jacob Georg Christian Adler (1756–1834), orientalist
- Peter Behrens (1868–1940), architect and designer
- Lars Clausen (1935–2010), sociologist
- Hans Ehrenberg (1883–1958), theologian
- Robert Koldewey (1855–1925), architect and archaeologist
- Salomon Maimon (1753–1800), philosopher
- Theodor Mommsen (1817–1903), classical scholar, Nobel laureate
- Friedrich Paulsen (1846–1908), philosopher
- Johannes Rehmke (1848–1930), philosopher
- Solomon Steinheim (1789–1866), physician and philosopher
- Johannes Versmann (1820–1899), politician
- Hermann Weyl (1885–1955), mathematician
