= Fellow Student =

Talmudist epithet; interim level between student and colleague

Fellow Student (Hebrew: תלמיד חבר) was a Talmudist epithet commonly used to describe the interim status of a disciple between the status of being merely a disciple of a teacher Rabbi and being practically equal in status. In many cases, a Fellow Student didn't fall short of his Rabbi, however he continued to perceive his teacher Rabbi above him and continued to learn from him. The term was commonly used in the Rabbinic period, however, the usage was continued throughout the Middle Ages and in latter times.
