= Textual variants in the Hebrew Bible =

Differences in Hebrew Bible manuscripts

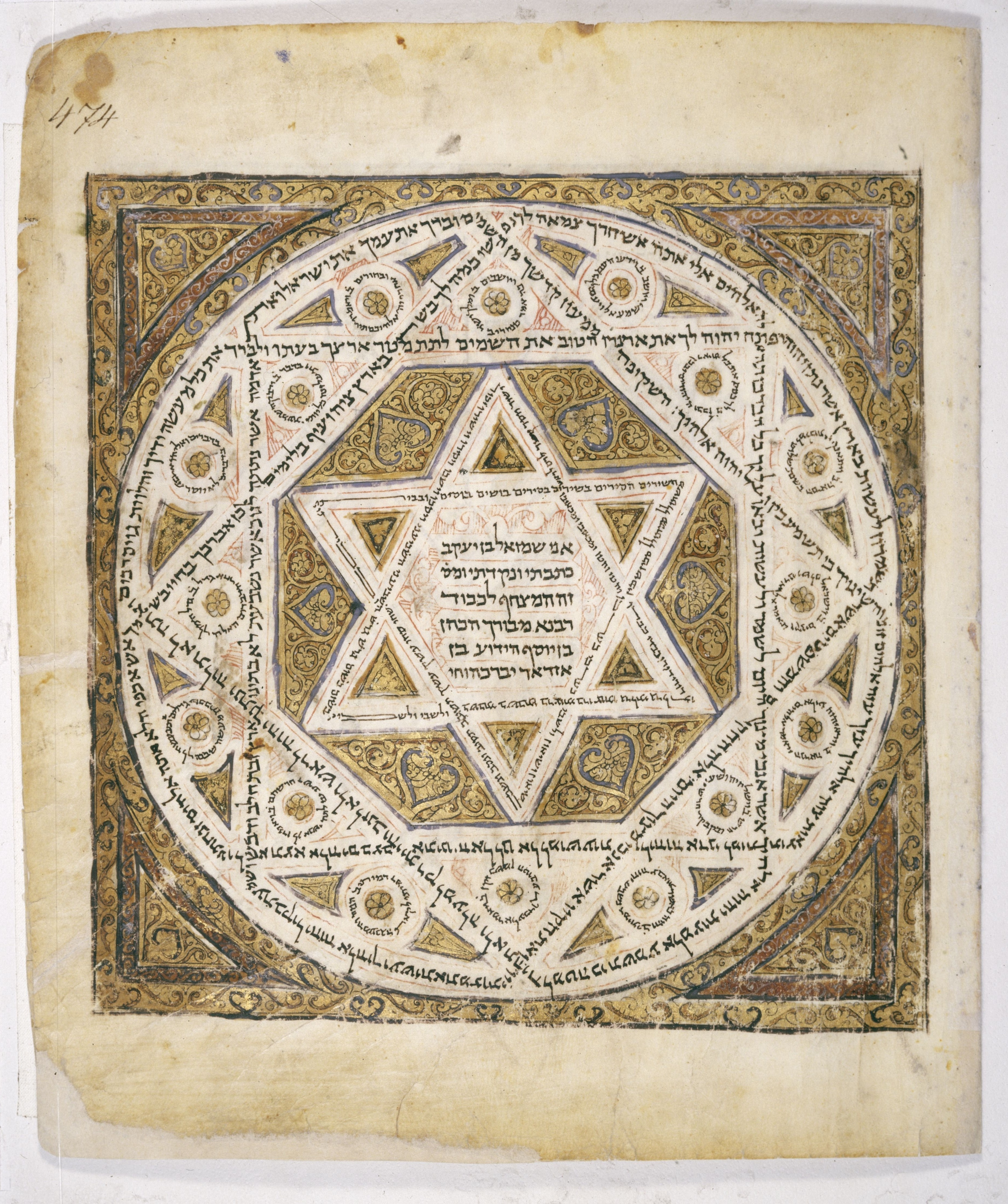

Textual variants in the Hebrew Bible manuscripts arise when a copyist makes deliberate or inadvertent alterations to the text that is being reproduced. Textual criticism of the Hebrew Bible (or Old Testament) has included study of its textual variants.

Although the Masoretic Text (MT) counts as the authoritative form of the Hebrew Bible according to Rabbinic Judaism, modern scholars seeking to understand the history of the Hebrew Bible use a range of sources. These include the Greek Septuagint (LXX), the Syriac language Peshitta translation, the Samaritan Pentateuch, the Dead Sea Scrolls collection, and quotations from rabbinic manuscripts. These sources may be older than the Masoretic Text in some cases, and often differ from it. These differences have given rise to the theory that yet another text, an Urtext of the Hebrew Bible, once existed and is the source of the versions extant today. However, such an Urtext has never been found, and which of the three commonly known versions (Septuagint, Masoretic Text, Samaritan Pentateuch) is closest to the Urtext is debated.

== Legend ==
Purported inter-relationship between significant ancient Old Testament manuscripts (some identified by their siglum).

Frequently used sigla (symbols and abbreviations) of Hebrew Bible manuscripts and editions include:

א: Codex Sinaiticus
A: Codex Alexandrinus
B: Codex Vaticanus (Roman Septuagint)
C: Codex Ephraemi Rescriptus
ABP: Apostolic Bible Polyglot
AC: Aleppo Codex
BHS: Biblia Hebraica Stuttgartensia
Brenton: Brenton's Septuagint Translation 1879
LC: Leningrad Codex
LXX: Septuagint (list)
LXX^{Rahlfs}: Rahlfs' Septuagint 1935
LXX^{Swete}: Swete's Septuagint 1930
K: ketiv
Kennicott^{x}: Kennicott's Vetus Test. Hebraicum
MAM: Miqra according to the Masorah
m.: Mishna
MT or 𝕸: Masoretic Text
MT^{Ginsburg}: C.D. Ginsburg's Masoretic Text
OL or: Old Latin / Vetus Latina (list)
Q: qere
xQx: Dead Sea Scrolls (list)
S: Peshitta
SP: Samaritan Pentateuch
Tg: Targum
Tg^{Be}: Targum Berlin Orientalis 1213
Tg^{J}: Targum Jonathan
Tg^{O}: Targum Onqelos
Tg^{N}: Targum Neofiti
Tg^{PJ}: Targum Pseudo-Jonathan
Vg: Vulgate (list)
Vg^{Clement}: Clementine Vulgate 1592
Vg^{Colunga&Turrado}: A. Colunga & L. Turrado's Vulgata 1946
Vg^{neo}: Nova Vulgata 1979
WLC: Westminster Leningrad Codex

== List ==
This list provides examples of known textual variants, and contains the following parameters: Hebrew texts written right to left, the Hebrew text romanised left to right, an approximate English translation, and which Hebrew manuscripts or critical editions of the Hebrew Bible this textual variant can be found in. Greek (Septuagint) and Latin (Vulgate) texts are written left to right, and not romanised. Sometimes additional translation or interpretation notes are added, with references to similar verses elsewhere, or in-depth articles on the topic in question.

=== Genesis 1 ===
Genesis 1:2, see also Tohu wa-bohu

וְהָאָ֗רֶץ הָיְתָ֥ה תֹ֙הוּ֙ וָבֹ֔הוּ, wəhāʔā́reṣ hāyəṯāh ṯṓhû wāḇṓhû, 'and the earth was formless and void,' – MT (4QGen^{b}) SP
ἡ δὲ γῆ ἦν ἀόρατος καὶ ἀκατασκεύαστος, 'but the earth was unseeable and unfashioned' – LXX ABP
Terra autem erat inanis et vacua, 'But the earth was lifeless and empty' – Vg^{Colunga&Turrado}

Genesis 1:7

וַֽיְהִי־כֵֽן, wayəhî-ḵên, 'and it was so.' – MT 4QGen^{b} 4QGen^{g} SP Damascus Pent. Codex
Et factum est ita., 'And so it was done.' – Vg^{Colunga&Turrado}
omitted – LXX ABP

Genesis 1:9

מָקֹ֣ום, māqôm, 'place' – MT 4QGen^{b} Damascus Pent. Codex SP..
מקוה, mqwh, 'ritual bath' – 4QGen.^{h} A mikveh is a ritual bath in modern Judaism.
συναγωγην, 'gathering' – LXX ABP. The English word "synagogue" is derived from συναγωγή.
locum, 'place' – Vg^{Colunga&Turrado} The English word "location" is derived from locus.

Genesis 1:9

και συνηχθη το νδωρ το υποκατω του ουρανου εις τας συναγωγας αυτών και ωφθη η ζηρα, 'And the water underneath the heaven gathered together into their gatherings, and the dry [land] appeared.' – LXX ABP. Compare Book of Jubilees 2:6.
omitted – 4QGen^{bg} MT SP Damascus Pent. Codex Vg^{Colunga&Turrado}

Genesis 1:14

וַיֹּ֣אמֶר אֱלֹהִ֗ים יְהִ֤י מְאֹרֹת֙ בִּרְקִ֣יעַ הַשָּׁמַ֔יִם לְהַבְדִּ֕יל בֵּ֥ין הַיּ֖וֹם וּבֵ֣ין הַלָּ֑יְלָה, wayyṓʔmer ʔĕlōhîm yəhî məʔōrōṯ bīrəqî(a)ʕ haššāmáyīm ləhaḇəddîl bên hayyôm ûḇên hallā́yəlāh, 'And God said, “Let there be lights in the dome of the sky to separate the day from the night' — MT
ויאמר אלהים יהי מאורות ברקיע השמים להאיר על הארץ ולהבדיל בין היום ובין הלילה, wyʔmr ʔlhym yhy mʔwrwt brqyʕ hšmym lhʔyr ʕl hʔrṣ wlhbdyl byn hywm wbyn hlylh, 'And God said: “Let there be lights in the firmament of the heavens to give light upon the earth and to separate the day from the night' — SP

=== Genesis 2 ===
Genesis 2:2

וַיְכַ֤ל אֱלֹהִים֙ בַּיּ֣וֹם הַשְּׁבִיעִ֔י מְלַאכְתּ֖וֹ אֲשֶׁ֣ר עָשָׂ֑ה, wayəḵal ʔĕlōhîm bayyôm haššəḇîʕî məlaʔḵəttô ʔăšer ʕāśāh, 'And on the seventh day God finished his work which he had made' — MT
ויכל אלהים ביום הששי מלאכתו אשר עשה, wykl ʔlhym bywm hššy mlʔktw ʔšr ʕšh, 'And God finished on the sixth day his work that he had done' — SP
καὶ συνετέλεσεν ὁ θεὸς ἐν τῇ ἡμέρᾳ τῇ ἕκτῃ τὰ ἔργα αὐτοῦ ἃ ἐποίησεν, 'And on the sixth day God finished his works that he had made' — LXX

Genesis 2:4

אֵ֣לֶּה תֹולְדֹ֧ות, ʔḗlleh ṯôləḏôṯ, 'These [are] the generations' – MT
Αὕτη ἡ βίβλος γενέσεως, 'This is the book of the origin' – LXX^{Swete} ABP
Istae sunt generationes, 'Those are (the) generations' – Vg^{Colunga&Turrado}

Genesis 2:4

אֶ֥רֶץ וְשָׁמָֽיִם, ʔéreṣ wəšāmā́yīm., '[the] earth and [the] heavens' – MT
שמימ וארץ, '[the] heavens and [the] earth' – SP
τὸν οὐρανὸν καὶ τὴν γῆν, 'the heaven and the earth' – LXX LXX^{Swete} ABP
caelum et terram, '(the) heaven and (the) earth' – Vg^{Colunga&Turrado}

Genesis 2:7, see also Soul in the Bible § Genesis 2:7

וַיִּיצֶר֩ יְהוָ֨ה אֱלֹהִ֜ים אֶת־ הָֽאָדָ֗ם עָפָר֙ מִן־ הָ֣אֲדָמָ֔ה, wayyîṣer YHWH ʔĕlōhîm ʔeṯ-hā́ʔāḏām ʕāp̄ār mīn-hā́ʔăḏāmāh,, 'hen the Lord God formed man from the dust of the ground' – MT SP.

There is a word play between אָדָם, ʔāḏām ("man", "human", later usually simply translated as the personal name "Adam") and אֲדָמָה, ʔăḏāmāh, 'ground, earth'.

καὶ ἔπλασεν ὁ θεὸς τὸν ἄνθρωπον χοῦν ἀπὸ τῆς γῆς·, 'And the god shaped the dust man from the earth' – LXX^{Swete}
καὶ ἔπλασεν ὁ θεὸς τὸν ἄνθρωπον χοῦν λαβών ἀπὸ τῆς γῆς, 'And the god shaped the man taking dust from the earth' – ABP
Formavit igitur Dominus Deus hominem de limo terrae, 'Therefore, (the) Lord God formed the human/man with the earth's mud/clay' – Vg^{Colunga&Turrado}

Genesis 2:8, see also Garden of Eden

גַּן־בְּעֵ֖דֶן מִקֶּ֑דֶם, gan-bəʔḗḏen mīqqéḏem;, 'a garden in Eden in the east'
παράδεισον ἐν Ἔδεμ κατὰ ἀνατολάς, 'paradise in Edem according to the east' – LXX^{Swete}
παράδεισον ἐν Ἔδεν κατὰ ἀνατολάς, 'paradise in Eden according to the east' – ABP
paradisum voluptatis a principio, 'paradise of pleasure from the beginning' – Vg^{Colunga&Turrado}

Genesis 2:17, see also tree of the knowledge of good and evil

אֲכָלְךָ֥, ʔăḵāləḵā, 'that you eat [qal infinitive singular]' – WLC
φάγησθε, '[you] should eat [active plural]' – LXX^{Swete}
φάγητε, '[you] should eat [middle plural]' – ABP
comederis, '[you] shall/should eat [future active indicative/subjunctive singular)' – Vg^{Colunga&Turrado}

Genesis 2:18, see also Eve

אֶֽעֱשֶׂה־, ʔeʕĕśeh-, 'I will make' – WLC
ποιήσωμεν, 'let [us] make' – LXX^{Swete} LXX^{Rahlfs} ABP
faciamus, 'let [us] make' – Vg^{Colunga&Turrado}

=== Genesis 4 ===
Genesis 4:8

וַיֹּ֥אמֶר קַ֖יִן אֶל־הֶ֣בֶל אָחִ֑יו וֽ͏ַיְהִי֙ בִּהְיוֹתָ֣ם בַּשָּׂדֶ֔ה וַיָּ֥קָם קַ֛יִן אֶל־הֶ֥בֶל אָחִ֖יו וַיַּהַרְגֵֽהוּ, wayyṓʔmer Qáyīn ʔel-Héḇel ʔāḥîw wayəhî bīhəyôṯām baśśāḏeh wayyấqām Qáyīn ʔel-Héḇel ʔāḥîw wayyaharəḡēhû, 'and Cain said to Abel his brother and when they were in the field, Cain rose up against Abel his brother and killed him' — MT
ויאמר קין אל הבל אחיו נלכה השדה ויהי בהיותם בשדה ויקם קין אל הבל אחיו ויהרגהו, wyʔmr qyn ʔl hbl ʔḥyw nlkh hšdh wyhy bhywtm bšdh wyqm qyn ʔl hbl ʔḥyw wyhrghw, 'And Qen said to Ebel his brother: "Let us go out to the field." And when they were in the field, Qen set upon his brother Ebel and killed him' — SP
καὶ εἶπεν Καιν πρὸς Αβελ τὸν ἀδελφὸν αὐτοῦ διέλθωμεν εἰς τὸ πεδίον καὶ ἐγένετο ἐν τῷ εἶναι αὐτοὺς ἐν τῷ πεδίῳ καὶ ἀνέστη Καιν ἐπὶ Αβελ τὸν ἀδελφὸν αὐτοῦ καὶ ἀπέκτεινεν αὐτόν, 'And Kain said to his brother Habel, "Let us go through into the plain." And it came about when they were in the plain, that then Kain rose up against his brother Habel and killed him' — LXX

Genesis 4:12, see also Curse and mark of Cain

נָ֥ע וָנָ֖ד, nāʕ wānāḏ, 'a fugitive and a wanderer' – WLC
στένων καὶ τρέμων, 'moaning and trembling' – LXX^{Swete} LXX^{Rahlfs} ABP
vagus et profugus, 'wandering and (a) fugitive' – Vg^{Colunga&Turrado}

Compare Genesis 4:14

Genesis 4:13

וַיֹּ֥אמֶר קַ֖יִן אֶל־יְהוָ֑ה גָּדֹ֥ול עֲוֹנִ֖י מִנְּשֹֽׂא׃, wayyṓʔmer Qáyīn ʔel-YHWH gāḏôl ʕăwōnî mīnnəśōʔ, 'And Cain said to the Lord, “My punishment is greater than I can bear!' – WLC
καὶ εἶπεν Κάιν πρὸς τὸν κύριον Μείζων ἡ αἰτία μου τοῦ ἀφεθῆναί με., 'And Cain said to (the) lord: My fault is (too) great to forgive me.' – LXX^{Swete} LXX^{Rahlfs} ABP
Dixitque Cain ad Dominum: Major est iniquitas mea, quam ut veniam merear., 'And Cain said to (the) Lord: My iniquity is greater than that [I] deserve pardon.' – Vg^{Colunga&Turrado}

Genesis 4:14

נָ֥ע וָנָ֖ד, nā' wā-nāḏ, 'a fugitive and a wanderer' – WLC
στένων καὶ τρέμων, 'moaning and trembling' – LXX^{Swete} LXX^{Rahlfs} ABP
vagus et profugus, 'wandering and (a) fugitive' – Vg^{Colunga&Turrado}

Compare Genesis 4:12

Genesis 4:15

שִׁבְעָתַ֖יִם יֻקָּ֑ם, šīḇʕāṯáyim yuqqām, 'sevenfold vengeance shall be taken [on him] or suffer sevenfold vengeance' – WLC
ἑπτὰ ἐκδικούμενα παραλύσει, 'will be disabled/paralysed seven [times] [by] punishing/avenging' – LXX^{Swete} LXX^{Rahlfs} ABP
septuplum punietur, 'shall be punished sevenfold' – Vg^{Colunga&Turrado}

Genesis 4:16, see also Land of Nod

בְּאֶֽרֶץ־נֹ֖וד קִדְמַת־עֵֽדֶן׃, bəʔéreṣ-nôḏ qīḏəmaṯ-ʕḗḏen, 'in [the] land (of) Nod east of Eden or [in] front [of] Eden' – WLC

קִדְמָה, qīḏəmāh can mean both "east" or "over against" or "in front of".

ἐν γῇ Ναὶδ κατέναντι Ἔδεμ., 'in [the] land (of) Naìd over against Edem.' – LXX^{Swete} LXX^{Rahlfs}
εν γη Ναϊδ κατέναντι Εδέν, 'in [land] (of) Naïd over against Eden.' – ABP
in terra ad orientalem plagam Eden., 'in (the) land to the eastern region (of) Eden.' – Vg^{Colunga&Turrado}

Genesis 4:20

וּמִקְנֶֽה׃, ûmīqəneh, 'and [raise] livestock' – WLC
κτηνοτρόφων, 'grazing cattle' – LXX^{Swete} LXX^{Rahlfs} ABP
atque pastorum., 'and of (the) shepherds.' – Vg^{Colunga&Turrado}

=== Genesis 5 ===
Genesis 5:1, see also Generations of Adam

זֶ֣ה סֵ֔פֶר תֹּולְדֹ֖ת אָדָ֑ם, zeh sḗp̄er tôləḏōṯ ʔāḏām, 'This [is] the book of the generations/genealogy (of) man or Adam' – WLC
Αὕτη ἡ βίβλος γενέσεως ἀνθρώπων., 'This [is] the book of [the] origin/birth of men or humans' – LXX^{Swete} LXX^{Rahlfs} ABP
Hic est liber generationis Adam., 'This is [the] book of [the] generation/offspring (of) Adam.' – Vg^{Colunga&Turrado}

=== Genesis 6 ===
Genesis 6:3

וַיֹּ֣אמֶר יְהוָ֗ה לֹֽא־יָד֨וֹן רוּחִ֤י בָֽאָדָם֙ לְעֹלָ֔ם, wayyṓʔmer YHWH lōʔ-yāḏôn rûḥî ḇāʔāḏām ləʕōlām, 'Then the Lord said, "My spirit shall not strive with (lit. 'judge, execute judgement on') man forever"' — MT, SP
καὶ εἶπεν κύριος ὁ θεός οὐ μὴ καταμείνῃ τὸ πνεῦμά μου ἐν τοῖς ἀνθρώποις τούτοις εἰς τὸν αἰῶνα, 'And the Lord God said, "My spirit shall not abide in these humans forever"' — LXX
לא ידור רוחי באדם לעולם, lʔ ydwr rwḥy bʔdm lʕwlm, 'my spirit will not dwell in humankind forever' — 4Q252

Genesis 6:6, see also Genesis flood narrative

וַיִּנָּ֣חֶם יְהוָ֔ה כִּֽי־עָשָׂ֥ה אֶת־הָֽאָדָ֖ם, wayyīnnā́ḥem YHWH kî-ʕāśāh ʔeṯ-hāʔāḏām, 'And the Lord was sorry that he had made humans on the earth' – WLC
καὶ ἐνεθυμήθη ὁ θεὸς ὅτι ἐποίησεν τὸν ἄνθρωπον, 'and the god reflected upon / pondered that [he] made the man' – LXX^{Swete} LXX^{Rahlfs} ABP
poenituit eum quod hominum fecisset, 'he regretted which/because/that/what [he] had made of men/humans' – Vg^{Colunga&Turrado}

Genesis 6:6

וַיִּתְעַצֵּ֖ב אֶל־לִבֹּֽו׃, wayyīṯəʔaṣṣēḇ ʔel-lībbô., 'and [he] was grieved in his heart.' – WLC
καὶ διενοήθη., 'and [he] considered it.' – LXX^{Swete} LXX^{Rahlfs} ABP
Et tactus dolore cordis intrinsecus,, 'And touched by [the] inner pain of [the] heart' – Vg^{Colunga&Turrado}

Genesis 6:14, see also Noah's Ark

עֲשֵׂ֤ה לְךָ֙ תֵּבַ֣ת עֲצֵי־גֹ֔פֶר, ʕăśēh ləḵā tēḇaṯ ʕăṣê-ḡṓp̄er, 'Make for yourself [a] box/basket of gopher wood' – WLC
ποίησον οὖν σεαυτῷ κιβωτὸν ἐκ ξύλων τετραγώνων·, 'Then make for yourself [a] wooden box out of four-cornered wood!' – LXX^{Swete} LXX^{Rahlfs} ABP
Fac tibi arcam de lignis laevigatis;, 'Make for yourself [a] chest/box of polished wood;' – Vg^{Colunga&Turrado}

In other contexts, each of the Hebrew, Greek and Latin words are used to describe a (wooden) box, basket or chest for storage. The traditionally used English word ark derives from the Latin word arca (from the verb arceō, "to keep off/away/close"), which outside of the Bible never refers to any kind of ship, but always a relatively small object for keeping items. The same nouns are used for the Ark of the Covenant. The Hebrew noun H1613 גֹ֔פֶר gopher is a hapax legomenon.

=== Genesis 7 ===
Genesis 7:9

שְׁנַ֨יִם שְׁנַ֜יִם בָּ֧אוּ אֶל־נֹ֛חַ אֶל־הַתֵּבָ֖ה זָכָ֣ר וּנְקֵבָ֑ה כּֽ͏ַאֲשֶׁ֛ר צִוָּ֥ה אֱלֹהִ֖ים אֶת־נֹֽחַ׃, šənáyīm šənáyīm bā́ʔû ʔel-Nō(a)ḥ ʔel-hattēḇāh zāḵār ûnəqēḇāh kaʔăšer ṣīwwāh ʔĕlōhîm ʔeṯ-Nō(a)ḥ, 'two and two, male and female, went into the ark with Noah, as God had commanded Noah' — MT
שנים שנים באו אל נח אל התבה זכר ונקבה כאשר צוה יהוה את נח, šnym šnym bʔw ʔl nḥ ʔl htbh zkr wnqbh kʔšr ṣwh yhwh ʔt nḥ, 'two and two came to Na into the ark, male and female, as Shema commanded Na' — SP

=== Genesis 34 ===
Genesis 34 in Brenton's Septuagint translation (1879)

Genesis 34:2

חֲמ֛וֹר הַֽחִוִּ֖י, ḥămôr haḥīwwî, 'Hamor the Hivite' – WLC
Ἐμμὼρ ὁ Χορραῖος, 'Emmor the Hurrian' – A LXX^{Swete}
Εμμώρ ο Ευαίος, 'Emmor the Evite' – Brenton ABP
Hemor Hevaei, 'Hemor of the Hevea' – Vg^{Colunga&Turrado}

Genesis 34:3 (twice)

הַֽנַּעֲרָ֔, hannaʕărā, 'the youth' [H5288] – MT
הנערה, hnʕrh, 'the young woman' [H5291] – SP
παρθένον/παρθένου, 'young woman or virgin' – LXX^{Swete} Brenton ABP
omitted – Vg^{Colunga&Turrado}

Genesis 34:3

עַל־, ʕal-, 'to' [H5921] – MT
אל, ʔl, 'towards' [H413] – SP
κατὰ, 'against/down/according to' – LXX^{Swete} Brenton ABP
omitted – Vg^{Colunga&Turrado}

Genesis 34:7, see also Rape in the Hebrew Bible § Genesis 34 § Historical-ethical analysis

וְכֵ֖ן לֹ֥א יֵעָשֶֽׂה׃, wəḵēn lōʔ yēʕāśeh., 'and such [a thing] should not be done' – WLC
καὶ οὐχ οὕτως ἔσται., 'And [it] shall not be thus.' LXX^{Swete} Brenton ABP
rem illicitam perpetrasset., '[he] had perpetrated/committed [an] illicit/unlawful act.' – Vg^{Colunga&Turrado}

Genesis 34:9

תִּקְח֥וּ לָכֶֽם׃, tiqḥû lāḵem, 'take to/for yourselves' – WLC
λάβετε τοῖς υἱοῖς ὑμῶν, 'take for your sons.' – LXX^{Swete} Brenton ABP
accipite, 'accept' – Vg^{Colunga&Turrado}

Genesis 34:14

וַיֹּאמְר֣וּ אֲלֵיהֶ֗ם, wayyōʔmərû ʔălēhem, 'And they said to them' – WLC
καὶ εἶπαν αὐτοῖς Συμεὼν καὶ Λευὶ οἱ ἀδελφοὶ Δείνας υἱοὶ δὲ Λείας, 'And Simeon and Levi the brothers of Dinah sons of Leah said to them' – LXX^{Swete}
καὶ εἶπαν αὐτοῖς Συμεὼν καὶ Λευὶ οἱ ἀδελφοὶ Δείνας/Δίνας, 'And Simeon and Levi the brothers of Dinah said to them' – Brenton ABP
omitted – Vg^{Colunga&Turrado}

=== Exodus 1 ===
Exodus 1:11

פִּתֹ֖ם, pi-ṯōm, 'Pithom' – MT
Πιθώμ, Pithom – LXX ABP
Pithon – OL^{Sb} Vg
Phythonam – OL^{L}

Exodus 1:15

שִׁפְרָ֔ה, šip̄-rāh, 'Shiphrah' – MT
Σεπφώρα, Sepphóra – LXX ABP
Sepphora – OL^{L}
Sephra – Vg

=== Exodus 3 ===
Exodus 3:14

וַיֹּ֤אמֶר אֱלֹהִים֙ אֶל־מֹשֶׁ֔ה אֶֽהְיֶ֖ה אֲשֶׁ֣ר אֶֽהְיֶ֑ה, way-yō-mer ’ĕ-lō-hîm ’el-mō-šeh, ’eh-yeh ’ă-šer ’eh-yeh;, '[And] the god/God said to Moses: "I am that/who I am",' – WLC
καὶ εἶπεν ὁ θεὸς πρὸς Μωυσῆν λέγων Ἐγώ εἰμι ὁ ὤν·, 'and the god said to Moses, saying: "I am the being / the [one] who is/exists."' – LXX^{Swete}
καὶ εἶπεν ὁ Θεὸς πρὸς Μωυσῆν, λέγων, ἐγώ εἰμι ὁ Ὤν·, 'And God spoke to Moses, saying, I am THE BEING' – Brenton
και είπεν ο θεός προς Μωυσήν εγώ ειμι ο ων, 'And God said to Moses, I am the one being.' – ABP
Dixit Deus ad Moysen: Ego sum qui sum., 'God said to Moses: I am who I am.' – Vg^{Colunga&Turrado}

See also I Am that I Am, Burning bush, and Yahweh § Name.

=== Exodus 6 ===
Exodus 6:14

פַלּוּא֙, p̄al-lū, 'Pallu' – MT
Φαλλους, Phallous – LXX
Φαλλού, Phallou – ABP
Fallus – OL^{L}
Phallu – Vg

Exodus 6:15

אֹ֙הַד֙, ’ō-haḏ, 'Ohad' – MT
Ωαδ, Oad – LXX
Ιωαδ, Ioad – B
Αωδ, Aod – ABP
Aod – OL^{L} Vg

Exodus 6:15

צֹ֔חַר, ṣō-ḥar, 'Zohar' – MT
Σααρ, Saar – LXX ABP
Saar – OL^{L}
Soer – Vg

Exodus 6:21

נֶ֖פֶג, ne-p̄eḡ, 'Nepheg' – MT
Ναφεγ, Napheg – LXX
Ναφεχ, Naphech – B
Ναφεκ, Naphek – ABP
Naphaec – OL^{L}
Nepheg – Vg

Exodus 6:22

אֶלְצָפָ֖ן, ’el-ṣā-p̄ān, 'Elzaphan' – MT
Ελισαφαν, Elisaphan – LXX ABP
Elisapham – OL^{L}
Elsaphan – Vg

Exodus 6:22

סִתְרִֽי, siṯ-rî, 'Zithri' – MT
Σετρι, Setri – LXX
Ζεχρι, Zechri – ABP
Zetri – OL^{L}
Sethri – Vg

Exodus 6:23

אֱלִישֶׁ֧בַע, ’ĕ-lî-še-ḇa‘, 'Elisheba' – MT
Ελισάβεθ, Elisabeth – LXX ABP
Elisabet – OL^{L}
Elisabe – Vg

Exodus 6:24

אֲבִיאָסָ֑ף, ’ă-ḇî-’ā-sāp̄, 'Abiasaph' – MT
Αβιασαφ, Abiasaph – LXX
Αβιασαρ, Abiasar – A B ABP
Abisar – OL^{L}
Abiasab – Vg

Exodus 6:25

פּֽוּטִיאֵל֙, pū-ṭî-’êl, 'Putiel' – MT
Φουτιήλ, Phoutiel – LXX ABP
Phutiel – OL^{L}
Phutihel – Vg

=== Exodus 13 ===
Exodus 13:20

אֵתָ֔ם, ’ê-ṯām, 'Etham' – MT
Οθομ, Othom – LXX
Othon – OL^{M}
Etham – Vg

=== Exodus 14 ===
Exodus 14:2

פִּ֣י הַחִירֹ֔ת, pî ha-ḥî-rōṯ, 'Pi Hahiroth' – MT
τῆς ἐπαύλεως, tes epaúleos, 'of the farm/estate/property' – LXX ABP
Epauleum – OL^{M}
Phiahiroth – Vg

Exodus 14:9

פִּ֣י הַחִירֹ֔ת, pî ha-ḥî-rōṯ, 'Pi Hahiroth' – MT
τῆς ἐπαύλεως, tes epaúleos, 'of the farm/estate/property' – LXX ABP
Epauleum – OL^{M}
Ahiroth – Vg

=== Exodus 17 ===
Exodus 17:1, see also Battle of Refidim

רְפִידִ֔ים, r-p̄î-ḏîm, 'Rephidim' – MT
Ραφιδιν, Raphidin – LXX
Ραφιδείν, Raphideín – ABP
Rapidin – OL^{M}
Raphidin – OL^{Sb}
Raphidim – Vg

Exodus 17:8, see also Battle of Refidim

רְפִידִ֔ים, r-p̄î-ḏîm, 'Rephidim' – MT
Ραφιδιν, Raphidin – LXX
Ραφιδίν, Raphidín – ABP
Rapidin – OL^{M}
Raphidin – OL^{Sb}
Raphidim – Vg

=== Exodus 19 ===
Exodus 19:2, see also Battle of Refidim

רְפִידִ֔ים, rə-p̄î-ḏîm, 'Rephidim' – MT
Ραφιδιν, Raphidin – LXX
Ραφιδείμ, Raphideím – ABP
Rapidin – OL^{M}
Raphidin – OL^{Sb}
Raphidim – Vg

Exodus 19:16

וַיְהִי֩ קֹלֹ֨ת וּבְרָקִ֜ים, way-hî qō-lōṯ ū-ḇə-rā-qîm, 'and there were voices/sounds/noises/thunders and lightnings / flashes of lightning / gleamings' – WLC
ויהי קולות וברקים, way-hi q-v-l-v-t ū-ḇə-rā-qîm, 'and there were voices/sounds/noises/thunders and lightnings / flashes of lightning / gleamings' – SP
καὶ ἐγίνοντο φωναὶ καὶ ἀστραπαὶ, 'and there were voices/sounds and lightnings / flashes of lightning / brightnesses' – LXX^{Swete} Brenton
και εγένοντο φωναί και άστραπαι, 'and there were voices/sounds and lightnings / flashes of lightning / brightnesses' – ABP
et ecce coeperunt audiri tonitrua, ac micare fulgura, 'and behold, thunders began to be heard, and lightnings to flash' – Vg^{Colunga&Turrado}

Compare Exodus 20:18.

=== Exodus 20 ===
Exodus 20 in Brenton's Septuagint translation (1879)

Exodus 20:1

וַיְדַבֵּ֣ר אֱלֹהִ֔ים אֵ֛ת כָּל־הַדְּבָרִ֥ים הָאֵ֖לֶּה לֵאמֹֽר׃ ס, way-ḏab-bêr ’ĕ-lō-hîm, ’êṯ kāl-had-də-ḇā-rîm hā-’êl-leh lê-mōr., 'And [the] god/God spoke all these words, saying,' – WLC (1QExod 4QPaleoExod^{m}) SP
Καὶ ἐλάλησεν Κύριος πάντας τοὺς λόγους τούτους λέγων, 'And the Lord spoke all these words, saying,' – LXX LXX^{Swete} LXX^{Rahlfs} Brenton ABP
Dominus, '[the] Lord' – Vg Vg^{Colunga&Turrado}

Compare Deuteronomy 5:5.

Exodus 20:2, see also I am the Lord thy God

אָֽנֹכִ֖י֙ יְהוָ֣ה אֱלֹהֶ֑֔יךָ, ’ā-nō-ḵî Yah-weh ’ĕ-lō-he-ḵā,, 'I [am] Yahweh your god' – WLC
Ἐγώ εἰμι Κύριος ὁ θεός σου, 'I am Lord the god of yours' – LXX^{Swete}
ἐγώ εἰμι Κύριος ὁ Θεός σου, 'I am Lord the God of yours' – Brenton
εγώ ειμι κύριος ο θεός σου, 'I am lord the god of yours' – LXX^{Rahlfs} ABP
Ego sum Dominus Deus tuus,, 'I am (the) Lord your God,' – Vg^{Colunga&Turrado}

Compare Deuteronomy 5:6.

Exodus 20:2, see also I am the Lord thy God

δουλίας, 'of slavery' – LXX^{Swete} (Pontic Greek spelling)
δουλείας, 'of slavery' – LXX^{Rahlfs} Brenton ABP (Attic and Koine Greek spelling)

Compare Deuteronomy 5:6.

Exodus 20:3, see also Thou shalt have no other gods before me

לֹֽ֣א יִהְיֶֽה־לְךָ֛֩ אֱלֹהִ֥֨ים אֲחֵרִ֖֜ים עַל־פָּנָֽ֗יַ, lō yih-yeh-lə-ḵā ’ĕ-lō-hîm ’ă-ḥê-rîm ‘al-pā-nā-ya,, 'You shall not have other/further gods over/against/above/beside me' – WLC

אֲחֵרִ֖֜ים ’ă-ḥê-rîm is from H312 אחר (achér), which can mean "another", "other", "different", "further", "subsequent", "following", "next", "after".
עַל־ al- is from H5921 על (al), which can mean "over", "against", "above", "beside(s)" (or "along(side)"), "about/concerning", "according", or many other less frequent meanings, and features in the name El Al ("Upwards").

Οὐκ ἔσονταί σοι θεοὶ ἕτεροι πλὴν ἐμοῦ., 'There shall not be to you other gods besides/except me' – LXX^{Swete} LXX^{Rahlfs} Brenton ABP

ἕτεροι heteroi is from ἕτερος, which can mean "other", "another", "different", "second", "after", and the origin of the English word hetero-.

Non habebis deos alienos coram me., '[You] shall have no alien/foreign/strange gods before me / in my presence.' – Vg^{Colunga&Turrado}

alienos is from aliēnus (compare alius and alter), and the origin of the English word alien.
Compare Deuteronomy 5:7 (Hebrew witnesses identical, Greek and Latin witnesses different).

Exodus 20:5, see also Thou shalt not make unto thee any graven image

כִּ֣י אָֽנֹכִ֞י יְהוָ֤ה אֱלֹהֶ֙יךָ֙ אֵ֣ל קַנָּ֔א, kî ’ā-nō-ḵî Yah-weh ’ĕ-lō-he-ḵā ’êl qan-nā, 'because I Yahweh your god [am a] jealous god' – MT WLC SP
קנוא, qanno, 'jealous' – Pap^{Nash} (H7072 instead of H7067 קַנָּא qanna in MT SP)
ἐγὼ γάρ εἰμι Κύριος ὁ θεός σου, θεὸς ζηλωτής,, 'because I am [the] Lord your god, [a] zealot-god,' – LXX^{Swete} LXX^{Rahlfs} Brenton ABP

The words ζῆλος and ζηλωτής are the roots of many words including zeal, zealot, zealotry, zealous, jealous and jealousy.

ego sum Dominus Deus tuus fortis, zelotes,, 'I am (the) Lord your strong God, [a] zelot,' – Vg^{Colunga&Turrado}

Compare Deuteronomy 5:9.

Exodus 20:5, see also Thou shalt not make unto thee any graven image

עַל־שִׁלֵּשִׁ֥ים וְעַל־רִבֵּעִ֖ים, ‘al- šil-lê-šîm wə-‘al- rib-bê-‘îm, 'to/on thirds and fourths' – WLC
ἕως τρίτης καὶ τετάρτης γενεᾶς, 'until of [the] third and fourth generation' – LXX^{Swete} LXX^{Rahlfs} Brenton
επί τρίτην και τετάρτην γενεάν, '(up)on/(un)to/against [the] third and fourth generation' – ABP
in tertiam et quartam generationem, 'into/to(wards)/against/until [the] third and fourth generation' – Vg^{Colunga&Turrado}

Compare Deuteronomy 5:9.

Exodus 20:7, see also Thou shalt not take the name of the Lord thy God in vain

λήψη, 'shall take' – ABP Brenton (classical Greek spelling)
λήμψῃ, 'shall take' – LXX^{Swete} LXX^{Rahlfs} (Koine Greek spelling)

Compare Deuteronomy 5:11.

Exodus 20:7, see also Thou shalt not take the name of the Lord thy God in vain

לֹ֤א יְנַקֶּה֙ יְהוָ֔ה, lō yə-naq-qeh Yah-weh, 'Yahweh will not acquit / leave unpunished / hold guiltless' – WLC
μὴ καθαρίσῃ Κύριος, '[the] Lord shall not cleanse' – LXX^{Swete} LXX^{Rahlfs}
μὴ καθαρίσει Κύριος, '[the] Lord shall not cleanse' – ABP
μὴ καθαρίσῃ Κύριος ὁ Θεός σου, '[the] Lord your God shall not cleanse' – Brenton
nec...habebit insontem Dominus eum, 'and [the] Lord will not hold/consider him innocent' – Vg^{Colunga&Turrado}

Compare Deuteronomy 5:11.

Exodus 20:10, see also Remember the sabbath day, to keep it holy

וּבְהֶמְתֶּ֔֗ךָ, ū-ḇə-hem-te-ḵā,, 'your cattle,' – WLC
ὁ βοῦς σου, καὶ τὸ ὑποζύγιόν σου, καὶ πᾶν κτῆνός σου, 'your ox/cow, and your beast of burden/donkey/mule, and all your beasts of burden/cattle,' – LXX^{Swete} LXX^{Rahlfs} Brenton ABP
jumentum tuum,, 'your beast of burden,' – Vg^{Colunga&Turrado}

Exodus 20:10, see also Remember the sabbath day, to keep it holy

וְגֵרְךָ֖֙ אֲשֶׁ֥֣ר בִּשְׁעָרֶֽ֔יךָ ׃, wə-ḡê-rə-ḵā ’ă-šer biš-‘ā-re-ḵā,, 'your stranger/sojourner who [is] within your gates' – WLC
καὶ ὁ προσήλυτος ὁ παροικῶν ἐν σοί., 'and the proselyte/convert the [one] sojourning among you.' – LXX^{Swete} LXX^{Rahlfs} Brenton ABP
et advena qui est intra portas tuas., 'and [the] stranger/foreigner/guest/newcomer who is within your gates.' – Vg^{Colunga&Turrado}

Exodus 20:11, see also Remember the sabbath day, to keep it holy

אֶת־הַיָּם֙, ’eṯ- hay-yām, 'the sea' – WLC
καὶ τὴν θάλασσαν, 'and the sea' – LXX^{Rahlfs} Brenton ABP
et mare,, 'and [the] sea,' – Vg^{Colunga&Turrado}
omitted – LXX^{Swete}

Compare Deuteronomy 5:15 (an entirely different sentence in all witnesses, which supports Sabbath observance by reference to the Exodus rather than the Genesis creation narrative).

Exodus 20:11, see also Remember the sabbath day, to keep it holy

עַל־כֵּ֗ן בֵּרַ֧ךְ יְהוָ֛ה אֶת־יֹ֥ום הַשַּׁבָּ֖ת, ‘al- kên, bê-raḵ Yah-weh ’eṯ- yō-wm haš-šab-bāṯ, 'Therefore, Yahweh blessed the Sabbath day' – WLC.

The noun H7676 שַׁבָּת shabbath "Sabbath" (Greek: G4521 σάββατον) is derived from, but independent of, the adjective H7637 שְׁבִיעִי šə-ḇî-‘î "seventh" (Greek: G1442 ἕβδομος/ἕβδομη, see hebdo-) earlier in this verse. See Biblical Sabbath § Etymology.

διὰ τοῦτο εὐλόγησεν Κύριος τὴν ἡμέραν τὴν ἑβδόμην, 'Because of this, [the] Lord blessed the seventh day' – LXX^{Swete} LXX^{Rahlfs} Brenton ABP
idcirco benedixit Dominus diei sabbati,, 'therefore [the] Lord blessed [the] day of Sabbath,' – Vg^{Colunga&Turrado}

Compare Deuteronomy 5:15 (an entirely different sentence in all witnesses, which supports Sabbath observance by reference to the Exodus rather than the Genesis creation narrative).

Exodus 20:12, see also Honour thy father and thy mother

ίνα ευ σοι γένηται, 'in order that good [things] should happen to you' – LXX^{Swete} LXX^{Rahlfs} Brenton ABP
omitted – WLC Vg^{Colunga&Turrado}

Compare Deuteronomy 5:16 (where this phrase is identical in Greek witnesses, and not omitted in Hebrew and Latin witnesses, albeit phrased slightly differently from Greek).

Exodus 20:13–15, see also Thou shalt not kill, Thou shalt not commit adultery and Thou shalt not steal

לֹ֥֖א תִּֿרְצָֽח׃ ס לֹ֖֣א תִּֿנְאָֽ֑ף׃ ס לֹ֣֖א תִּֿגְנֹֽ֔ב׃ ס, lō trə-ṣāḥ. s lō tnə-’āp̄. s lō tḡə-nōḇ. s, '[You] shall not murder. [You] shall not commit adultery. [You] shall not steal.' – MT WLC SP
לוא תנאף׃ ס לוא תרצח׃ ס לוא תִּֿגְנֹֽ֔ב׃ ס, wə-lō tnə-’āp̄. s wə-lō trə-ṣāḥ. s wə-lō tḡə-nōḇ. s, 'And [you] shall not commit adultery. And [you] shall not murder. And [you] shall not steal.' – Pap^{Nash}
Οὐ μοιχεύσεις. Οὐ κλέψεις. Οὐ φονεύσεις., '[You] shall not commit adultery. [You] shall not steal. [You] shall not murder.' – LXX^{Swete} LXX^{Rahlfs} Brenton
Οὐ φονεύσεις. Οὐ μοιχεύσεις. Οὐ κλέψεις., '[You] shall not murder. [You] shall not commit adultery. [You] shall not steal.' – ABP

The verb κλέπτω ("to steal") is at the root of modern English words such as kleptomania and kleptocracy.

Non occides. Non moechaberis. Non furtum facies., '[You] shall not kill/slay. [You] shall not commit adultery. [You] shall not commit theft.' – Vg^{Colunga&Turrado}

Compare Deuteronomy 5:17–19.

Exodus 20:16, see also Thou shalt not bear false witness against thy neighbour

לֹֽא־תַעֲנֶ֥ה בְרֵעֲךָ֖ עֵ֥ד שָֽׁקֶר׃ ס, lō-ṯa-‘ă-neh ḇə-rê-‘ă-ḵā šā-qer., 'You shall not answer/respond false/lying witness/evidence against your neighbour' – WLC
Οὐ ψευδομαρτυρήσεις κατὰ τοῦ πλησίον σου μαρτυρίαν ψευδῆ., 'You shall not witness falsely against your neighbour [as a] lying witness' – LXX^{Swete} LXX^{Rahlfs} Brenton ABP
Non loqueris contra proximum tuum falsum testimonium., '[You] do/shall not speak/declare false testimony against your neighbour.' – Vg^{Colunga&Turrado}

Exodus 20:17, see also Thou shalt not covet

לֹ֥א תַחְמֹ֖ד בֵּ֣ית רֵעֶ֑ךָ לֹֽא־תַחְמֹ֞ד אֵ֣שֶׁת רֵעֶ֗ךָ, lō ṯaḥ-mōḏ bêṯ rê-‘e-ḵā; lō-ṯaḥ-mōḏ ’ê-šeṯ rê-‘e-ḵā,, 'You shall not covet the house of your neighbour. You shall not covet the wife of your neighbour' – WLC
Οὐκ ἐπιθυμήσεις τὴν γυναῖκα τοῦ πλησίον σου· οὐκ ἐπιθυμήσεις τὴν οἰκίαν τοῦ πλησίον σου οὔτε τὸν ἀγρὸν αὐτοῦ, 'You shall not covet the woman/wife of your neighbour. You shall not covet the house of your neighbour, nor his field,' – LXX^{Swete} LXX^{Rahlfs} Brenton
Οὐκ ἐπιθυμήσεις τὴν γυναῖκα τοῦ πλησίον σου· οὐκ ἐπιθυμήσεις τὴν οἰκίαν τοῦ πλησίον σου ουδέ τὸν ἀγρὸν αὐτοῦ, 'You shall not covet the woman/wife of your neighbour. You shall not covet the house of your neighbour, nor his field,' – ABP
Non concupisces domum proximi tui, nec desiderabis uxorem ejus,, '[You] shall not covet [the] house of your neighbour, nor shall [you] desire his wife,' – Vg^{Colunga&Turrado}

concupīscō is derived from (con)cupiō ("I desire"), the origin of the English verb "to covet" and the name of the Roman god Cupid.

Exodus 20:17, see also Thou shalt not covet

ούτε παντός κτήνους αυτού, 'nor any of his cattle/beasts [of burden]' – LXX^{Swete} LXX^{Rahlfs} Brenton ABP
omitted – WLC Vg^{Colunga&Turrado}

Exodus 20:18

וְכָל־, wə-ḵāl, 'And all' – WLC
Καὶ πᾶς, 'And all' – LXX^{Swete} LXX^{Rahlfs} Brenton
πας, 'All' – ABP
Cunctus autem, 'But/and all' – Vg^{Colunga&Turrado}

Exodus 20:18

הַקֹּולֹ֜ת וְאֶת־הַלַּפִּידִ֗ם, haq-qō-w-lōṯ ’eṯ-hal-lap-pî-ḏim,, 'the voices/sounds/noises/thunders and the torches' – WLC
την φωνήν και τας λαμπάδας, 'the voice/sound and the torches/lamps/lanterns' – LXX^{Swete} LXX^{Rahlfs} Brenton ABP. φωνή and λᾰμπᾰ́ς are the origins of the English words phone and lamp respectively.
voces et lampades, '(the) voices and (the) torches/lamps/lanterns' – Vg^{Colunga&Turrado}. vōx is the root of the English word voice.

Compare Exodus 19:16

Exodus 20:19

פֶּן־, pen-, 'lest/or' – WLC
μὴ, 'not' – LXX^{Swete} Brenton
μήποτε, 'lest/otherwise' – LXX^{Rahlfs} ABP
ne forte, 'lest' – Vg^{Colunga&Turrado}

Exodus 20:20

Μωσῆς, 'Moses' – LXX^{Swete}
Μωυσῆς, 'Moses' – LXX^{Rahlfs} Brenton ABP

Exodus 20:21

ἱστήκει δὲ ὁ λαὸς, 'And the people stood' – LXX^{Swete}
εἱστήκει δὲ ὁ λαὸς, 'And the people stood' – LXX^{Rahlfs} Brenton
εἱστήκει δὲ πας ὁ λαὸς, 'And all the people stood' – ABP

Exodus 20:23

תעשון, ṯa-‘ă-śūn, '[you] have made or [you] shall make' – MT WLC
תעשו, ta-asú, '[you] have made' – SP

Exodus 20:23

אִתִּ֑י...לָכֶֽם׃, ’it-tî...lā-ḵem., 'against me... for yourselves.' – WLC
ὑμῖν αὐτοῖς...ὑμῖν ἑαυτοῖς, 'to you to/for yourselves...to you to/for each other' – LXX^{Swete}
ὑμῖν αὐτοῖς...ὑμῖν αυτοῖς, 'to you to/for yourselves...to you to/for yourselves' – Brenton
εαυτοίς...υμίν αυτοίς, 'for each other...to you to/for yourselves' – LXX^{Rahlfs} ABP
[omitted]....vobis, 'to/for you' – Vg^{Colunga&Turrado}

Exodus 20:26

אֲשֶׁ֛ר לֹֽא־תִגָּלֶ֥ה עֶרְוָתְךָ֖, ’ă-šer lō- ṯig-gā-leh ‘er-wā-ṯə-ḵā, 'so (that) your nakedness may not be uncovered' – WLC
ὅπως ἂν μὴ ἀποκαλύψῃς τὴν ἀσχημοσύνην σου, 'so that [you] should/will not uncover/reveal your nakedness/indecency/shame' – LXX^{Swete} LXX^{Rahlfs} Brenton ABP

ἀποκαλύψῃς is likely a misspelling of the verb ἀποκαλύψεις. The noun αποκάλυψη is the root of words such as apocalypse, apocalyptic and apocalypticism.

ne reveletur turpitudo tua., 'lest your unsightliness/indecency/shame should be revealed.' – Vg^{Colunga&Turrado}

Compare Leviticus 18.

=== Exodus 21 ===
Exodus 21:17 (LXX 21:16)

וּמְקַלֵּ֥ל אָבִ֛יו וְאִמֹּ֖ו מֹ֥ות יוּמָֽת׃ ס, ū-mə-qal-lêl ’ā-ḇîw wə-’im-mōw mō-wṯ yū-māṯ. s, 'And he who curses his father or his mother surely shall be put to death.' – MT
Ὁ κακολογῶν πατέρα αὐτοῦ ἢ μητέρα αὐτοῦ τελευτήσει θανάτῳ., 'He that speaks evil of his father or his mother must end in death.' – LXX^{Swete} Brenton
Ὁ κακολογῶν πατέρα αὐτοῦ ἢ μητέρα αὐτοῦ θανάτῳ τελευτάτω., 'He that speaks evil of his father or his mother in death let him end.' – ABP
Qui maledixerit patri suo, vel matri, morte moriatur., 'Who[ever] speaks evil of his father, or mother, let [him] die by death.' – Vg^{Clement} Vg^{Colunga&Turrado}

Compare New Testament quotation:
Ὁ κακολογῶν πατέρα ἢ μητέρα θανάτῳ τελευτάτω., 'He that speaks evil of father or mother in death let him end.' – Mark 7:10
Compare Deuteronomy 21:18–21.

=== Exodus 32 ===
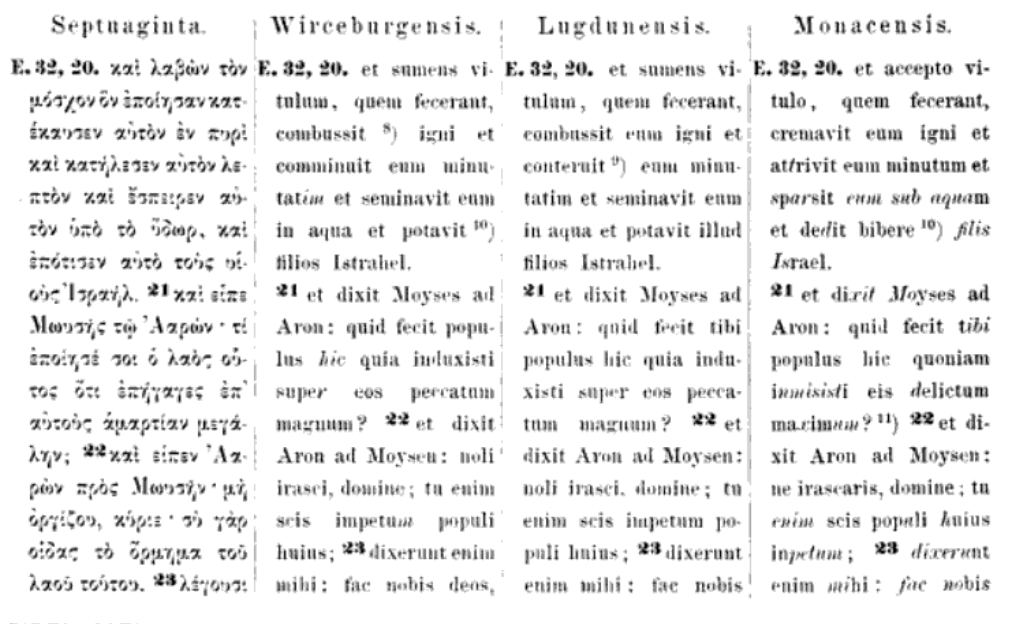
Ziegler (1883) comparing three different Vetus Latina manuscripts (W, L, M) of Exodus 32 with the Septuagint (LXX)

=== Exodus 34 ===
Exodus 34:11

אֶת־הָאֱמֹרִי֙ וְהַֽכְּנַעֲנִ֔י וְהַחִתִּי֙ וְהַפְּרִזִּ֔י וְהַחִוִּ֖י וְהַיְבוּסִֽי׃, ’eṯ- hā-’ĕ-mō-rî wə-hak-kə-na-‘ă-nî, wə-ha-ḥit-tî wə-hap-pə-riz-zî, wə-ha-ḥiw-wî wə-hay-ḇū-sî., 'the Amorite and the Canaanite and the Hittite and the Perizzite and the Hivite and the Jebusite.' – WLC
τὸν Ἀμορραῖον καὶ Χαναναῖον καὶ Φερεζαῖον καὶ Χετταῖον καὶ Εὑαῖον καὶ Γεργεσαῖον καὶ Ἰεβουσαῖον·, 'the Amorite and Canaanite and Perizzite and Hittite and Hivite and Gergesite and Jebusite;' – LXX^{Swete}
τὸν Αμορραῖον καὶ Χαναναῖον καὶ Χετταῖον καὶ Φερεζαῖον καὶ Ευαῖον καὶ Γεργεσαῖον καὶ Ιεβουσαῖον·, 'the Amorite and Canaanite and Hittite and Perizzite and Hivite and Gergesite and Jebusite;' – LXX^{Rahlfs} Brenton
τὸν Αμορραῖον καὶ τὸν Χαναναῖον καὶ τὸν Χετταῖον καὶ τὸν Φερεζαῖον καὶ τὸν Ευαῖον καὶ τὸν Γεργεσαῖον καὶ τὸν Ιεβουσαῖον·, 'the Amorite and the Canaanite and the Hittite and the Perizzite and the Hivite and the Gergesite and the Jebusite;' – ABP
Amorrhaeum, et Chananaeum, et Hethaeum, Pherezaeum quoque, et Hevaeum, et Jebusaeum., '[the] Amorite, and (the) Canaanite, and (the) Hittite, (the) Perizzite too, and (the) Hivite, and (the) Jebusite.' – Vg^{Colunga&Turrado}

Exodus 34:14, see also Thou shalt have no other gods before me

כִּ֛י לֹ֥א תִֽשְׁתַּחֲוֶ֖ה לְאֵ֣ל אַחֵ֑ר כִּ֤י יְהוָה֙ קַנָּ֣א שְׁמֹ֔ו אֵ֥ל קַנָּ֖א הֽוּא׃, 'For you shall not worship any other god, for Yahweh, whose name [is] Jealous, is a jealous god.' – WLC
οὐ γὰρ μὴ προσκυνήσητε θεοῖς ἑτέροις· ὁ γὰρ Κύριος ὁ θεὸς ζηλωτὸν ὄνομα, θεὸς ζηλωτής ἐστι(ν)., 'For [you] should not revere other gods: for Lord the god [has?] [a] zealot-name, [the] god is [a] zealot. or for the Lord God, a jealous name, is a jealous God.' – LXX^{Swete} Brenton
οὐ γὰρ μὴ προσκυνήσητε θεῷ ἑτέρῳ· ὁ γὰρ κύριος ὁ θεὸς ζηλωτὸν ὄνομα, θεὸς ζηλωτής ἐστι(ν)., 'For [you] should not revere another god: for lord the god [has?] [a] zealot-name, [the] god is [a] zealot or for lord the god [has] [the] name "zealot", the god is [a] zealot.' – LXX^{Rahlfs} ABP
noli adorare deum alienum. Dominus zelotes nomen ejus; Deus est aemulator., 'Do not adore alien/foreign/strange gods. Lord zealot [is] his name; God is (an) emulator/rival.' – Vg^{Colunga&Turrado}

Compare Exodus 20:3 and Deuteronomy 5:7,9.

Exodus 34:17, see also Thou shalt not make unto thee any graven image

אֱלֹהֵ֥י מַסֵּכָ֖ה לֹ֥א תַעֲשֶׂה־לָּֽךְ׃, ’ĕ-lō-hê mas-sê-ḵāh lō ṯa-‘ă-śeh- lāḵ., '[You] shall not make molten gods to/for you(rself).' – WLC
καὶ θεοὺς χωνευτοὺς οὐ ποιήσεις σεαυτῷ., 'And you shall not make molten gods to/for yourself.' – LXX^{Swete} LXX^{Rahlfs} Brenton ABP
Deos conflatiles non facies tibi., 'You shall not make cast/molten gods to/for you.' – Vg^{Colunga&Turrado}

Compare Exodus 20:5 and Deuteronomy 5:8.

=== Leviticus 18 ===
Leviticus 18 in Brenton's Septuagint translation (1879)

Leviticus 18:4

תִּשְׁמְר֖וּ לָלֶ֣כֶת, tiš-mə-rū lā-le-ḵeṯ, '[you] shall keep to walk' – WLC
φυλάξεσθε πορεύεσθαι, '[you] shall keep [you] shall walk' – LXX^{Swete} LXX^{Rahlfs}
φυλάξεσθε, καὶ πορεύεσθαι, '[you] shall keep, and [you] shall walk' – Brenton ABP
et ambula[biti]s, 'and [you] shall walk' – OL^{L} OL^{W}
servabitis, et ambulabitis, '[you] shall serve, and [you] shall walk' – Vg^{Colunga&Turrado}.

The verb servāre is the root of the word service; the verb ambulāre is the root of the word ambulance.

Leviticus 18:5

אֲשֶׁ֨ר יַעֲשֶׂ֥ה אֹתָ֛ם הָאָדָ֖ם וָחַ֣י בָּהֶ֑ם, ’ă-šer ya-‘ă-śeh ’ō-ṯām hā-’ā-ḏām wā-ḥay bā-hem, '(because) if a man does [them,] (then/and/that) he shall live by them.' – WLC
אֲשֶׁ֨ר יַעֲשֶׂ֥ה אֹתָ֛ם הָאָדָ֖ם וחיה בָּהֶ֑ם, ’ă-šer ya-‘ă-śeh ’ō-ṯām hā-’ā-ḏām wā-ḥā-yāh bā-hem, '(because) if a man does [them,] (then/and/that) she shall live by them.' – SP

Compare Exodus 1:16 (last verb). It is unclear whether the verb(s) used for "to live" is/are H2421 חָיָה chayah or H2421 חָיַי chayay.

ἃ ποιήσας ἄνθρωπος ζήσεται ἐν αὐτοῖς·, 'by which [a] man doing shall live by them;' – LXX^{Swete} LXX^{Rahlfs}
ἃ ποιήσας αυτά άνθρωπος ζήσεται ἐν αὐτοῖς·, 'by which [a] man doing them shall live by them;' – Brenton ABP
qui ea fecerit, 'who shall have done them' – OL^{W}
quae faciet homo, uiuet in eis:, 'which [a] man shall do, shall live by them.' – OL^{L}
quae faciens homo, vivet in eis., 'which [a] man doing, shall live by them.' – Vg^{Colunga&Turrado}

Leviticus 18:5

אֲנִ֖י יְהוָֽה׃ ס, ’ă-nî Yah-weh. s, 'I [am] Yahweh.' – WLC
ἐγὼ κύριος ὁ θεὸς ὑμῶν., 'I [am] (the) lord your god.' – LXX^{Swete} LXX^{Rahlfs} ABP
ἐγὼ Κύριος., 'I [am] (the) Lord.' – Brenton
Ego Dominus., 'I [am] (the) Lord.' – Vg^{Colunga&Turrado}

Leviticus 18:7

matris suae, 'of his/her mother:' – OL^{L} OL^{W}
matris tuae, 'of your mother:' – Vg^{Colunga&Turrado}

Leviticus 18:7

אִמְּךָ֣ הִ֔וא, ’im-mə-ḵā hî, 'he [is] your mother' – MT WLC
אִמְּךָ֣ היא, ’im-mə-ḵā hi, 'she [is] your mother' – SP
μήτηρ γάρ σού ἐστιν(,), 'for/because she is your mother(,)' – LXX^{Swete} LXX^{Rahlfs} Brenton ABP
confusione enim., 'truly in confusion.' – OL^{L}
mater tua est:, 'your mother is: or [she] is your mother:' – Vg^{Colunga&Turrado}

Leviticus 18:7

καὶ οὐκ ἀποκαλύψεις τὴν ἀσχημοσύνην αὐτῆς., 'and you shall not uncover the nakedness of her.' – LXX^{Swete} LXX^{Rahlfs} Brenton
την ασχημοσύνην αυτής ουκ αποκαλύψεις, 'the nakedness of her you shall not uncover' – ABP
omitted – OL^{L}

Leviticus 18:8

Confusionem mulieris patris tui non denudabis, confusionem patris tui et., '[The] confusion of your father's woman/wife you shall not denude: and is your father's confusion.' – OL^{L}
Turpitudinem uxoris patris tui non discooperies: turpitudo enim patris tui est., '[The] shame of your father's wife you shall not uncover: for it is your father's shame.' – Vg^{Colunga&Turrado}

Leviticus 18:9

עֶרְוַ֨ת אֲחֹֽותְךָ֤ בַת־אָבִ֙יךָ֙ אֹ֣ו בַת־אִמֶּ֔ךָ, ‘er-waṯ ’ă-ḥō-wṯ-ḵā ḇaṯ- ’ā-ḇî-ḵā ’ōw ḇaṯ- ’im-me-ḵā,, 'The nakedness of your sister (the) daughter of your father or (the) daughter of your mother' – WLC
ἀσχημοσύνην τῆς ἀδελφῆς σου ἐκ πατρός σου ἢ ἐκ μητρός σου, 'The nakedness of your sister out of your father or out of your mother' – LXX^{Rahlfs} Brenton ABP
ἀσχημοσύνην τῆς ἀδελφῆς σου ἐκ πατρός σου ἢ μητρός σου, 'The nakedness of your sister out of your father or (of) your mother' – LXX^{Swete}
Turpitudinem sororis tuae en matre tua et ex patre tuo, '[The] shame of your sister in your mother and out of your father' – OL^{W}
Confusionem sororis tuae uel ex patre uel ex matre, '[The] confusion of your sister either out of [your] father or out of [your] mother' – OL^{L}
Turpitudinem sororis tuae ex patre sive ex matre,, '[The] shame of your sister out of [your] father or out of [your] mother,' – Vg^{Colunga&Turrado}

Leviticus 18:9

η γεγεννημένης, 'or born' – LXX^{Rahlfs} Brenton ABP
γεγεννημένης ἢ, 'born or' – LXX^{Swete}
intus natae aut natae foris,, 'at home born or born outdoors,' – OL^{L}
quae domi vel foris genita est,, 'who is born at home or outdoors,' – Vg^{Colunga&Turrado}

Leviticus 18:9

quoniam tua confusione filiae uxoris patris tui non denudabis confusionem eius, 'because by/through your confusion of [the] daughter of your father's wife [you] shall not uncover his confusion' – OL^{L}
omitted – all other witnesses

Leviticus 18:10

Turpitudinem filiae filii tui vel neptis ex filia non revelabis: quia turpitudo tua est., '[You] shall not reveal [the] shame of your son's daughter or daughter's daughter: for [it] is your shame.' – Vg^{Colunga&Turrado}
omitted – OL^{L}

Leviticus 18:17

λήψῃ, 'shall take' – Brenton ABP (classical Greek spelling)
λήμψῃ, 'shall take' – LXX^{Swete} LXX^{Rahlfs} (Koine Greek spelling)

Leviticus 18:18

λήψῃ, 'shall take' – Brenton ABP (classical Greek spelling)
λήμψῃ, 'shall take' – LXX^{Swete} LXX^{Rahlfs} (Koine Greek spelling)

Leviticus 18:19

בְּנִדַּ֣ת טֻמְאָתָ֑הּ, bə-nid-daṯ ṭum-’ā-ṯāh, 'in menstrual/impure uncleanness' – WLC
εν χωρισμώ ακαθαρσίας αυτής, 'in separation of her uncleanness' – LXX^{Swete} ABP
in diuortio, 'in divorce/separation' – ^{wz}
in separationem munditiae eius, 'in separation of his cleanness' – OL^{L}
quae patitur menstrua, 'who suffers from menstruation' – Vg^{Colunga&Turrado}

Leviticus 18:19

לֹ֣א תִקְרַ֔ב, lō ṯiq-raḇ, '[you] shall not approach' – WLC
ουκ εισελεύση, '[you] shall not go into / enter' – Brenton ABP
οὐ προσελεύσῃ, '[you] shall not go towards' – LXX^{Swete} LXX^{Rahlfs}
non accedes,, '[you] shall not approach,' – OL^{L} Vg^{Colunga&Turrado}

Leviticus 18:20

Et ad mulierem proximi tui, 'And to your neighbour's woman/wife' – OL^{L}
Cum uxore proximi tui, 'With your neighbour's wife' – Vg^{Colunga&Turrado}

Leviticus 18:20

לֹא־תִתֵּ֥ן שְׁכָבְתְּךָ֖ לְזָ֑רַע, lō- ṯit-tên šə-ḵā-ḇə-tə-ḵā lə-zā-ra‘, '[you] shall not give copulation/intercourse seed/sowing/offspring' – WLC
οὐ δώσεις κοίτην σπέρματός σου, '[you] shall not give [the] marriage-bed for your sperm/semen' – LXX^{Swete} LXX^{Rahlfs} Brenton ABP
non dabis cubilem seminis tui,, '[you] shall not give the [bed] of your seed,' – OL^{L}
non coibis, nec seminis, '[you] shall not come together / have sex, nor... by seed/semen' – Vg^{Colunga&Turrado}

Leviticus 18:21, see also Moloch § Biblical attestations and Child sacrifice § Ban in Leviticus

וּמִֽזַּרְעֲךָ֥ לֹא־תִתֵּ֖ן לְהַעֲבִ֣יר לַמֹּ֑לֶךְ, ū-miz-zar-‘ă-ḵā lō- ṯit-tên lam-mō-leḵ, 'And [you] shall not let any of your descendents pass through [the fire, i.e. to sacrifice] to Moloch' – WLC
καὶ ἀπὸ τοῦ σπέρματός σου οὐ δώσεις λατρεύειν ἄρχοντι, 'And of your sperm/semen/offspring/descendants [you] shall not give to serve [an] archon' – LXX^{Swete} LXX^{Rahlfs} Brenton ABP
Et semini tuo non dabis seruire superposito,, 'And your seed you shall not give to serve placed on top,' – OL^{L}
De semine tuo non dabis ut consecretur idolo Moloch,, 'Of your semen/offspring [you] shall not give [any] to consecrate to [an] idol of Moloch,' – Vg^{Colunga&Turrado}

Leviticus 18:22, see also Leviticus 18 § Homosexuality

וְאֶ֨ת־זָכָ֔ר לֹ֥א תִשְׁכַּ֖ב מִשְׁכְּבֵ֣י אִשָּׁ֑ה תֹּועֵבָ֖ה הִֽוא׃, wə-’eṯ-zā-ḵār, lō’ ṯīš-kaḇ mīš-kə-ḇē ’īš-šā; tō-‘ē-ḇā hī’, 'And with a male, you shall not lie (down) on the beds of a woman/wife; he/it is an abomination.' – WLC
ࠅࠣࠀࠕ ࠆࠟࠊࠠࠓ ࠋࠞࠀ ࠕࠩࠔࠬࠊࠠࠁ ࠌࠡࠔࠬࠊࠠࠁࠩࠉ ࠀࠩࠔ࠙ࠢࠄ ࠕࠧࠅ࠙ࠜࠏࠁࠢࠄ ࠄࠩࠉࠀ, wa’t zā̊ː-kār lā̊ː’ tīš-kā̊b māːš-kå-bī ’īš-ša; tū-‘ē-bā’ ī’, 'And with a male, you shall not lie (down) on the beds of a woman/wife; she/it is an abomination.' – SP
καὶ μετὰ ἄρσενος οὐ κοιμηθήσῃ κοίτην γυναικός· βδέλυγμα γάρ ἐστιν., 'And with a man you shall not sleep in a (marriage-)bed of a woman/wife; because it is a detestable thing.' LXX^{Swete}
και μετά άρσενος ου κοιμηθήση κοίτην γυναικείαν βδέλυγμα γαρ εστι, 'And with a man you shall not sleep in a female (marriage-)bed, because it is a detestable thing.' ABP
Et cum masculo non dormibis cubile muliebrae: exsecratio enim est., 'And with [a] male you shall not sleep in [the/a] bed of [a] woman: for [it] is [a] curse.' – OL^{L}

The word muliebrae is an incorrect declension of muliebris; genitive singular (muliebris, "of a woman", "of womanly") was likely the intended form, compare fēminīnae ("of a woman(ly)", "of feminine").

Cum mare ne concumbas eo concubitu quo cum foemina solet: abominada res est., 'With [a] man [you] should not share the bed as is custom in [the] manner of sleeping as with [a] woman: [it] is [an] abominable thing.' – Robert Estienne (1545)
Cum masculo non commiscearis coitu femineo, quia abominatio est., 'With [a] male [you] shall not intermingle according to [the] feminine intercourse, because it is [an] abomination.' – Vg^{Clement} Vg^{Colunga&Turrado}

Compare Leviticus 20:13; Genesis 49:4.

Leviticus 18:23

לֹא־תִתֵּ֥ן שְׁכָבְתְּךָ֖, lō- ṯit-tên šə-ḵā-ḇə-tə-ḵā, '[you] shall not give lying/bedding(/copulation/intercourse)' – WLC
ου δώσεις τὴν κοίτην σου, '[you] shall not give the marriage-bed of yours' – LXX^{Swete} LXX^{Rahlfs} Brenton
ου δώσεις κοίτην σου, '[you] shall not give your marriage-bed' – ABP
non dabis cubilem tuum, '[you] shall not give your bed' – OL^{L}
non coibis, '[you] shall not come together' – Vg^{Colunga&Turrado}

Leviticus 18:23

εἰς σπερματισμὸν, 'for insemination / [a] discharge of sperm' – LXX^{Swete} LXX^{Rahlfs} Brenton ABP
in sementium, 'in [the] seed' – OL^{L}

sēmentium is a Late Latin nonstandard noun for "seed".

omitted – WLC Vg^{Colunga&Turrado}

Leviticus 18:25

εξεμιάνθη – Brenton ABP
ἐμιάνθη – LXX^{Swete} LXX^{Rahlfs}

Leviticus 18:25

ἀδικίαν αὐτοῖς – LXX^{Rahlfs} Brenton ABP
αὐτοῖς ἀδικίαν – LXX^{Swete}

Leviticus 18:26

πάντα τὰ προστάγματά, 'all the commandments' – LXX^{Swete} LXX^{Rahlfs} Brenton
τὰ προστάγματά, 'the commandments' – ABP

Leviticus 18:26

και, 'and' – LXX^{Rahlfs} Brenton ABP
ἢ, 'or' – LXX^{Swete}

Leviticus 18:27

πρότεροι, 'before [plural]' – LXX^{Swete} LXX^{Rahlfs}
πρότερον, 'before [singular]' – Brenton ABP

Leviticus 18:29

μέσου, 'from the middle/midst' – ABP
omitted – LXX^{Swete} LXX^{Rahlfs} Brenton

Leviticus 18:30

ποιήσητε, '[you] shall do [plural]' – LXX^{Swete} LXX^{Rahlfs} Brenton
ποιήτε, '[you] shall do [singular]' – ABP

Leviticus 18:30

ἃ, 'which' – LXX^{Rahlfs} Brenton ABP
ὃ, 'the' – LXX^{Swete}

=== Leviticus 20 ===
Leviticus 20:13

וְאִ֗ישׁ אֲשֶׁ֨ר יִשְׁכַּ֤ב אֶת־זָכָר֙ מִשְׁכְּבֵ֣י אִשָּׁ֔ה תֹּועֵבָ֥ה עָשׂ֖וּ שְׁנֵיהֶ֑ם מֹ֥ות יוּמָ֖תוּ דְּמֵיהֶ֥ם בָּֽם׃, wə-’îš, ’ă-šer yiš-kaḇ ’eṯ-zā-ḵār miš-kə-ḇê ’iš-šāh, tō-w-‘ê-ḇāh ‘ā-śū šə-nê-hem; mō-wṯ yū-mā-ṯū də-mê-hem bām., 'And a man, who sleeps with a male on the beds of a woman/wife, [they] have both done a detestable thing; [they] will be killed to die, [their] blood(guilt)s [are] on them.' – WLC
ואיש אשר ישכב את־זכר משכבי אשה תועבה עשו מות יומתו שניהם דמיהם בם׃, wə-’îš, ’ă-šer yiš-kaḇ ’eṯ-zā-ḵār miš-kə-ḇê ’iš-šāh, tō-w-‘ê-ḇāh ‘ā-śū; mō-wṯ yū-mā-ṯū šə-nê-hem də-mê-hem bām., 'And a man, who sleeps with a male on the beds of a woman/wife, [they] have done a detestable thing; both will be killed to die, [their] blood(guilt)s [are] on them.' – SP
καὶ ὃς ἂν κοιμηθῇ μετὰ ἄρσενος κοίτην γυναικός, βδέλυγμα ἐποίησαν ἀμφότεροι· θανατούσθωσαν, ἔνοχοί εἰσιν., 'And who ever slept with [a] male in the (marriage-)bed of a woman/wife, both have done a detestable thing; let [them] be put to death, they are liable/guilty.' – LXX^{Swete}
καὶ ὃς ἂν κοιμηθῇ μετὰ ἄρσενος κοίτην γυναικός, βδέλυγμα ἐποίησαν ἀμφότεροι· θανάτῳ θανατούσθωσαν, ἔνοχοί εἰσιν., 'And whoever shall lie with a male as with a woman/wife, they have both wrought abomination; let them die the death, they are guilty.' – Brenton
και ος αν κοιμηθή μετά άρσενος κοίτην γυναικός, βδέλυγμα εποίησαν αμφότεροι θανάτω θανατούσθωσαν ένοχοί εισιν., 'And who ever slept with [a] male in the (marriage-)bed of a woman/wife, both have done a detestable thing; let [them] be killed to death, or [they] have done a detestable thing; let both be killed to death, they are liable/guilty.' – ABP
Qui dormierit cum masculo coitu femineo, uterque operatus est nefas: morte moriantur: sit sanguis eorum super eos., 'Whoever sleeps with a male according to the feminine intercourse, both have done a wrong: let them die the death: may their blood be upon them.' – Vg^{Clement} Vg^{Colunga&Turrado}

Compare Leviticus 18:22; Genesis 49:4.

=== Leviticus 25 ===
Leviticus 25:42

אֲשֶׁר־הֹוצֵ֥אתִי אֹתָ֖ם מֵ, ’ă-šer- hō-w-ṣê-ṯî ’ō-ṯām mê-, 'whom [I] brought out of/from' – WLC
οὓς ἐξήγαγον, 'whom [I] led out' – LXX^{Swete} LXX^{Rahlfs} Brenton ABP
quos eduxi, 'whom [I] led out' – OL^{L}
et ego eduxi eos, 'and I led them out' – Vg^{Colunga&Turrado}

Leviticus 25:42

לֹ֥א יִמָּכְר֖וּ מִמְכֶּ֥רֶת עָֽבֶד׃, lō yim-mā-ḵə-rū mim-ke-reṯ ‘ā-ḇeḏ., '[they] shall not be sold in [a] sale of [a] slave.' – WLC
οὐ πραθήσεται ἐν πράσει οἰκέτου., '[they] shall not be sold in [a] sale of [a] household slave.' – LXX^{Swete} LXX^{Rahlfs} Brenton ABP
Non ueniet uenalido serui., '[He] will not come as [a] buyable/cheap slave.' – OL^{L}
non veneant conditione servorum:, 'let [them] not come in(to) [the] condition of slaves:' – Vg^{Colunga&Turrado}

Leviticus 25:43

וְיָרֵ֖אתָ מֵאֱלֹהֶֽיךָ׃, wə-yā-rê-ṯā mê-’ĕ-lō-he-ḵā., 'and/but [you] shall fear your god.' – WLC
καὶ φοβηθήσῃ Κύριον τὸν θεόν σου., 'and/but [you] shall fear (the) Lord your god' – LXX^{Swete} LXX^{Rahlfs} Brenton
και φοβηθήση τον θεόν σου, 'and/but [you] shall fear your god' – ABP
et timebis Deum tuum., 'and [you] shall fear your God.' – OL^{L}
sed metuito Deum tuum., 'but [you/he] shall fear your God.' – Vg^{Colunga&Turrado}

Leviticus 25:44

אֲשֶׁ֣ר יִהְיוּ־לָ֑ךְ, ’ă-šer yih-yū- lāḵ, 'whom you may have [plural]' – WLC
ὅσοι ἂν γένωνταί σοι, 'as many as should be to you [singular]' – LXX^{Swete} LXX^{Rahlfs} Brenton ABP
quicumque fuerunt, 'who(so)ever have been [plural]' – OL^{L}
sint vobis, 'should be to/for you [plural]' – Vg^{Colunga&Turrado}

Leviticus 25:44

אֲשֶׁ֣ר, ’ă-šer, 'which' – WLC
όσοι, 'as many as' – LXX^{Swete} LXX^{Rahlfs} Brenton ABP
quae, 'which' – OL^{L} Vg^{Colunga&Turrado}

Leviticus 25:44

מֵהֶ֥ם תִּקְנ֖וּ עֶ֥בֶד וְאָמָֽה׃, mê-hem tiq-nū ‘e-ḇeḏ wə-’ā-māh., 'from them [you] may buy/acquire (a) male slave and (a) female slave.' – WLC
ἀπ᾽ αὐτῶν κτήσεσθε δοῦλον καὶ δούλην., 'from them [you] shall acquire/buy (a) male slave and (a) female slave.' – LXX^{Swete} LXX^{Rahlfs} Brenton ABP
ab illis possidebitis,, 'from them [you] will inherit' – OL^{L}
omitted – Vg^{Colunga&Turrado}

Leviticus 25:45

אֲשֶׁ֣ר עִמָּכֶ֔ם, ’ă-šer ‘im-mā-ḵem, 'who/which [are] with you' – WLC
των μεθ' υμών, 'of the ones with you [plural]' – ABP
omitted – LXX^{Swete} LXX^{Rahlfs} Brenton OL^{L} Vg^{Colunga&Turrado}

=== Numbers 22 ===
Numbers 22:1

בְּעַֽרְבֹ֣ות מֹואָ֔ב, bə-‘ar-ḇō-wṯ mō-w-’āḇ,, 'in the plains of Moab' – WLC
בערבת מואב, bə-‘ar-wṯ mō-w-’āḇ,, 'in the evening/west of Moab' – SP
ἐπὶ δυσμῶν Μωὰβ, 'on the west of Moab / upon the descent/sunset of Moab' – LXX^{Swete} LXX^{Rahlfs} Brenton ABP

The words עֲרָבָה arabah/'aravá ("steppe", "desert", "plain"), עֶרֶב érev ("evening", "sunset") and מַעֲרָב ma'aráv ("west") are all etymologically related to each other, and maybe also cognates of words such as "Europe" (see Europe § Name) and "Arab" (see Etymology of Arab). See also Numbers 31:12.

=== Numbers 31 ===
Numbers 31 in Brenton's Septuagint translation (1879)

Numbers 31:12

עַֽרְבֹ֣ת מוֹאָ֔ב, ‘ar-ḇōṯ mō-w-’āḇ,, 'the plains/desert/wilderness of Moab' – WLC
Ἀραβὼθ Μωάβ,, 'Araboth Moab,' – LXX^{Swete} Brenton
αραβώθ Μωάβ, '[the] wilderness of Moab' – ABP

It is unclear whether the Hebrew original meant a general geographical feature ('plains/desert/wilderness') or a specific toponym (probably the region now known as "Arabah"), or whether Greek translators failed to translate מוֹאָ֔ב ‘ar-ḇōṯ as a general geographical feature and turned it into a specific toponym, and hence the Arabah region got its name from this toponymisation. See also Numbers 22:1.

Numbers 31:15

וַיֹּ֥אמֶר אֲלֵיהֶ֖ם מֹשֶׁ֑ה הַֽחִיִּיתֶ֖ם כָּל־נְקֵבָֽה׃, way-yō-mer ’ă-lê-hem mō-šeh; ha-ḥî-yî-ṯem kāl-nə-qê-ḇāh., 'And Moses said to them: 'Have you kept alive all the women?' – MT
וַיֹּ֥אמֶר אֲלֵיהֶ֖ם מֹשֶׁ֑ה למה הַֽחִיִּיתֶ֖ם כָּל־נְקֵבָֽה׃, way-yō-mer ’ă-lê-hem mō-šeh; lá-ma ha-ḥî-yî-ṯem kāl-nə-qê-ḇāh., 'And Moses said to them: 'Why have you kept alive all the women?' – SP
καὶ εἶπεν αὐτοῖς Μωυσῆς Ἵνα τί ἐζωγρήσατε πᾶν θῆλυ;, 'And Moses said to them: 'Why did you take/catch/save alive every female?' – LXX^{Swete}
καὶ εἶπεν αὐτοῖς Μωυσῆς ινατί ἐζωγρήσατε πᾶν θῆλυ, 'And Moses said to them: 'Why did you take/catch/save alive every female?' – ABP Brenton

Numbers 31:16

לִמְסָר־מַ֥עַל בַּיהוָ֖ה, lim·sār-ma·‘al Yah·weh, 'to trespass / to instigate sacrilege against Yahweh' – MT
τοῦ ἀποστῆσαι καὶ ὑπεριδεῖν τὸ ῥῆμα Κυρίου, 'of their leaving / moving away from and disgarding the word of the Lord' – LXX^{Swete} ABP Brenton. ἀποστῆσαι is a cognate of the English word "apostasy".

See also Numbers 31 § Tabernacle desecration hypothesis.

Numbers 31:16

עַל־דְּבַר־פְּעֹ֑ור, ‘al-də-ḇar-pə-‘ō-wr;, 'in the incident of Peor' – MT
ἕνεκεν Φογώρ, 'because of Phogor' – LXX^{Swete} ABP Brenton

Numbers 31:17

וְעַתָּ֕ה הִרְג֥וּ כָל־זָכָ֖ר בַּטָּ֑ף, wə-‘at-tāh hir-ḡū ḵāl zā-ḵār baṭ-ṭāp̄;, 'Therefore, kill every male among the little ones / infants / (little) children' – MT
καὶ νῦν ἀποκτείνατε πᾶν ἀρσενικὸν ἐν πάσῃ τῇ ἀπαρτίᾳ, 'And now kill every male among all the spoils/captivity/chattel' – LXX^{Swete} ABP Brenton

Numbers 31:17

וְכָל־אִשָּׁ֗ה יֹדַ֥עַת אִ֛ישׁ לְמִשְׁכַּ֥ב זָכָ֖ר הֲרֹֽגוּ׃, wə-ḵāl ’iš-šāh, yō-ḏa-‘aṯ ’îš lə-miš-kaḇ zā-ḵār hă-rō-ḡū., 'and every woman, who has known a man in a male bed / by lying with him, kill.' – MT
καὶ πᾶσαν γυναῖκα ἥτις ἔγνωκεν κοίτην ἄρσενος ἀποκτείνατε·, 'And every woman who knew [the] marriage-bed of a man, kill!' – LXX^{Swete} ABP
πᾶσαν γυναῖκα, ἥτις ἔγνωκεν κοίτην ἄρσενος, ἀποκτείνατε., 'slay every woman, who has known the lying with man.' – Brenton

Compare Judges 21:11.

Numbers 31:18

וְכֹל֙ הַטַּ֣ף בַּנָּשִׁ֔ים, wə-ḵōl haṭ-ṭap̄ ban-nā-šîm,, '[But] all the young women / women-children / girls,' – WLC
πᾶσαν τὴν ἀπαρτίαν τῶν γυναικῶν, 'All the spoils/captivity/chattel of the women' – LXX^{Swete}
Καὶ πᾶσαν τὴν ἀπαρτίαν τῶν γυναικῶν,, 'And [as for] all the captivity of women' – Brenton
και πάσαν την απαρτίαν των γυναικών, 'And all the chattel of the women' – ABP

Numbers 31:18

אֲשֶׁ֥ר לֹא־יָדְע֖וּ מִשְׁכַּ֣ב זָכָ֑ר, ’ă-šer lō-yā-ḏə-‘ū miš-kaḇ zā-ḵār;, 'who have not known a male bed / a man intimately / a man by lying with him,' – WLC
ἥτις οὐκ οἶδεν κοίτην ἄρσενος,, 'who have not known a/the male bed,'– LXX^{Swete}
ἥτις οὐκ οἶδε κοίτην ἄρσενος,, 'who have not known the lying with man, / [the] marriage-bed of a man,' – Brenton ABP

Numbers 31:18

הַחֲי֖וּ לָכֶֽם׃, ha-ḥă-yū lā-ḵem., 'spare/save them / keep them alive for yourselves.' – WLC
ζωγρήσατε αὐτάς., 'save ye them alive / take/capture them alive / for life!'– LXX^{Swete} Brenton ABP

Compare Judges 21:11

=== Numbers 32 ===
Numbers 32:1

גָ֖ד, ḡāḏ, 'Gad' – MT
גד ולחצי שבט המנשה, ḡāḏ wə-la-ḥă-ṣî šê-ḇeṭ mə-naš-šeh, 'Gad and the half tribe of Manasseh' – [4QNum^{b}] SP
Γαδ, 'Gad' – LXX^{Swete} ABP Brenton

Compare Numbers 32:33

Numbers 32:2

בְנֵֽי־גָ֖ד וּבְנֵ֣י רְאוּבֵ֑ן, ḇə-nê-ḡāḏ ū-ḇə-nê rə-’ū-ḇên;, 'the sons of Gad and the sons of Reuben' – MT
בני גד ובני ראובן וחצי שבט המנשה, ḇə-nê-ḡāḏ ū-ḇə-nê rə-’ū-ḇên wə-ḥă-ṣî šê-ḇeṭ mə-naš-šeh;, 'the sons of Gad and the sons of Reuben and the half tribe of Manasseh' – SP
οἱ υἱοὶ Ρουβην καὶ οἱ υἱοὶ Γαδ, 'the sons of Rouben and the sons of Gad' – LXX^{Swete} ABP Brenton

Numbers 32:3

וְנִמְרָ֔ה, wə-nim-rāh,, 'and Nimrah' – MT SP
καὶ Ναμβρα, 'and Nambra' – LXX^{Swete} Brenton
και Ναμβρών, 'and Nambron' – ABP

Numbers 32:4

הִ֑וא, hî, 'he or is' – MT, see also en:wikt:הוא#Hebrew
היא, hu, 'she or it' – SP, see also en:wikt:היא#Hebrew
ἐστίν, 'is' – LXX^{Swete}
εστί, 'is' – ABP Brenton

Numbers 32:6

לִבְנֵי־גָ֖ד וְלִבְנֵ֣י רְאוּבֵ֑ן, liḇ-nê-ḡāḏ wə-liḇ-nê rə-’ū-ḇên;, 'to the sons of Gad and (to) the sons of Reuben' – MT
לבני ראובן ולבני גד ולחצי שבט המנשה, liḇ-nê-rə-’ū-ḇên wə-liḇ-nê ḡāḏ wə-la-ḥă-ṣî šê-ḇeṭ mə-naš-šeh;, 'to the sons of Reuben and (to) the sons of Gad and (to) the half tribe of Manasseh' – [4QNum^{b}] SP
τοῖς υἱοῖς Γαδ καὶ τοῖς υἱοῖς Ρουβην, 'to the sons of Gad and (to) the sons of Rouben' – LXX^{Swete} ABP Brenton

=== Deuteronomy 5 ===
Deuteronomy 5 in Brenton's Septuagint translation (1879)

Deuteronomy 5:6, see also I am the Lord thy God

אָֽנֹכִי֙ יְהוָ֣ה אֱלֹהֶ֔יךָ, ’ā-nō-ḵî Yah-weh ’ĕ-lō-he-ḵā,, 'I Yahweh your god' – WLC
Ἐγώ Κύριος ὁ θεός σου, 'I Lord the god of yours' – LXX^{Swete} – LXX^{Rahlfs}
εγώ ειμι κύριος ο θεός σου, 'I am Lord the god of yours' – Brenton ABP
Ego Dominus Deus tuus, 'I Lord your God' – Vg^{Colunga&Turrado}

Compare Exodus 20:2.

Deuteronomy 5:7, see also Thou shalt have no other gods before me

לֹ֣א יִהְיֶ֥ה־לְךָ֛֩ אֱלֹהִ֥֨ים אֲחֵרִ֖֜ים עַל־פָּנָֽ֗יַ׃, lō yih-yeh- lə-ḵā ’ĕ-lō-hîm ’ă-ḥê-rîm ‘al- pā-nā-ya., 'You shall not have other/further gods over/against/above/beside me' – WLC SP
לוא יִהְיֶ֥ה לְךָ֛֩ אלוהים אֲחֵרִ֖֜ים עַל־פָּנָֽ֗יַ, l-v-a yih-yeh- lə-ḵā l-v-h-m ’ă-ḥê-rîm ‘al- pā-nā-ya, 'You shall not have other/further gods over/against/above/beside me' – 4QDeut^{n} (4QDeut^{j})
Οὐκ ἔσονταί σοι θεοὶ ἕτεροι πρὸ προσώπου μου., 'There shall not be other gods to you before my face.' – LXX^{Swete} LXX^{Rahlfs} Brenton ABP
Non habebis deos alienos in conspectu meo., '[You] shall have no alien/foreign/strange gods in my sight/presence/proximity.' – Vg^{Colunga&Turrado}

Compare Exodus 20:3.

Deuteronomy 5:11, see also Thou shalt not take the name of the Lord thy God in vain

λήψη, 'shall take' – ABP Brenton (classical Greek spelling)
λήμψῃ, 'shall take' – LXX^{Swete} LXX^{Rahlfs} (Koine Greek spelling)

Compare Exodus 20:7.

Deuteronomy 5:11, see also Thou shalt not take the name of the Lord thy God in vain

לֹ֤א יְנַקֶּה֙ יְהוָ֔ה, lō yə-naq-qeh Yah-weh, 'Yahweh will not acquit / leave unpunished / hold guiltless' – WLC
μὴ καθαρίσῃ Κύριος, '[the] Lord shall not cleanse' – LXX^{Swete} LXX^{Rahlfs}. κᾰθᾰρός ("clean, pure") is the origin of the terms catharsis and Catharism.
μὴ καθαρίσῃ Κύριος ὁ Θεός σου, '[the] Lord your God shall not cleanse' – Brenton
μὴ καθαρίσει Κύριος ο θεός σου, '[the] Lord your god shall not cleanse' – ABP
non erit impunitus, '[he] will not be unpunished' – Vg^{Colunga&Turrado}. impunitus is the root of the term impunity.

Compare Exodus 20:7.

Deuteronomy 5:14, see also Remember the sabbath day, to keep it holy

וְגֵרְךָ֖֙ אֲשֶׁ֥֣ר בִּשְׁעָרֶֽ֔יךָ ׃, wə-ḡê-rə-ḵā ’ă-šer biš-‘ā-re-ḵā,, 'your stranger/sojourner who [is] within your gates' – WLC
καὶ (ὁ) προσήλυτος ὁ παροικῶν ἐν σοί., 'and the proselyte/convert the [one] sojourning among you.' – LXX^{Swete} LXX^{Rahlfs} Brenton (no 'ὁ') ABP
et peregrinus qui est intra portas tuas., 'and [the] traveller who is within your gates.' – Vg^{Colunga&Turrado}

Compare Exodus 20:10.

Deuteronomy 5:15, see also Remember the sabbath day, to keep it holy

בְּאֶ֣רֶץ מִצְרַ֔֗יִם, bə-’e-reṣ miṣ-ra-yim,, 'in the land of Egypt,' – WLC
ἐν γῇ Αἰγύπτῳ,, 'in [the] land of Egypt,' – LXX^{Swete} LXX^{Rahlfs} Brenton ABP
in Ægypto,, 'in Egypt,' – Vg^{Colunga&Turrado}

Compare Exodus 20:11 (an entirely different sentence in all witnesses, which supports Sabbath observance by reference to the Genesis creation narrative rather than the Exodus).

Deuteronomy 5:15, see also Remember the sabbath day, to keep it holy

καὶ ἁγιάζειν αὐτήν., 'and to sanctify it.' – LXX^{Swete} LXX^{Rahlfs} Brenton ABP
omitted – WLC Vg^{Colunga&Turrado}

Compare Exodus 20:11: וַֽיְקַדְּשֵֽׁהוּ׃, way-qad-də-šê-hū. s, 'and (he) consecrated it.' καὶ ηγίασε αὐτήν., 'and [he] sanctified it.' et sanctificavit eum., 'and [he] sanctified it.'.

Deuteronomy 5:16, see also Honour thy father and thy mother

לְמַ֣עַן ׀ יַאֲרִיכֻ֣ן יָמֶ֗יךָ, lə-ma-‘an ya-’ă-rî-ḵun yā-me-ḵā, 'that your days/times may be long [plural]' – WLC
μακροχρόνιοι ἦτε, 'long times may [you] be [plural]' – LXX^{Swete}
μακροχρόνιος γένη, '[a] long time may [you] happen [singular]' – LXX^{Rahlfs} Brenton ABP
longo vivas tempore, '(during a) long time may [you] live [singular]' – Vg^{Colunga&Turrado}

Compare Exodus 20:12.

Deuteronomy 5:16, see also Honour thy father and thy mother

וּלְמַ֙עַן֙ יִ֣יטַב לָ֔ךְ, ū-lə-ma-‘an yî-ṭaḇ lāḵ, 'that it may be [singular] well with you' – WLC
ίνα ευ σοι γένηται, 'in order that good [things] should happen [plural] to you' – LXX^{Swete} LXX^{Rahlfs} Brenton ABP (mentioned before καὶ ἵνα μακροχρόνιοι ἦτε / καὶ ἵνα μακροχρόνιοι ἦτε)
et bene sit tibi, 'and [it] may be [singular] well with/for you' – Vg^{Colunga&Turrado}

Compare Exodus 20:12 (where this phrase is omitted in Hebrew and Latin witnesses, but identical in Greek witnesses).

Deuteronomy 5:17–19, see also Thou shalt not kill, Thou shalt not commit adultery and Thou shalt not steal

לֹ֥֖א תִּֿרְצָֽח׃ ס וְלֹ֖֣א תִּֿנְאָֽ֑ף׃ סוְלֹ֖֣א תִּֿגְנֹֽ֔ב׃ ס, lō trə-ṣāḥ. s wə-lō tnə-’āp̄. s wə-lō tḡə-nōḇ. s, '[You] shall not murder. And [you] shall not commit adultery. And [you] shall not steal.' – WLC
Οὐ μοιχεύσεις. Οὐ φονεύσεις. Οὐ κλέψεις., '[You] shall not commit adultery. [You] shall not murder. [You] shall not steal.' – LXX^{Swete} LXX^{Rahlfs}
Οὐ φονεύσεις. Οὐ μοιχεύσεις. Οὐ κλέψεις., '[You] shall not murder. [You] shall not commit adultery. [You] shall not steal.' – Brenton ABP
Non occides, neque moechaberis, furtumque non facies:, '[You] shall not kill/slay, nor shall [you] commit adultery, and theft [you] shall not commit:' – Vg^{Colunga&Turrado}

Compare Exodus 20:13–15.

Deuteronomy 5:21, see also Thou shalt not covet

ούτε παντός κτήνους αυτού, 'nor any of his cattle/beasts [of burden]' – LXX^{Swete} LXX^{Rahlfs} Brenton ABP
omitted – WLC Vg^{Colunga&Turrado}

Compare Exodus 20:17.

Deuteronomy 5:21, see also Thou shalt not covet

כֹ֖ל, ḵōl, 'all/everything/anything' – WLC
πάντα, 'all or any/every [thing]' – Brenton ABP
universa, 'all [things] (combined) or [the] whole [of things]' – Vg^{Colunga&Turrado}
omitted – LXX^{Swete} LXX^{Rahlfs}

Compare Exodus 20:17.

=== Deuteronomy 22 ===
Deuteronomy 22:25

הַנַּעַר, han-na-‘ar, 'a boy or a young man' – K
הַֽנַּעֲרָה֙, han-na-‘ar-rāh, 'a girl/damsel or a young woman' – Q SP
την παίδα, 'a child/boy/girl' – LXX^{Swete} ABP Brenton

Deuteronomy 22:25

וּמֵ֗ת הָאִ֛ישׁ, ū-mêṯ hā-’îš, 'then the man shall die' – MT
αποκτενείτε τον άνθρωπον, 'you shall kill the man' – ABP
ἀποκτενεῖτε, 'you shall kill' – LXX^{Swete} Brenton

Deuteronomy 22:26

־[ולנער] (וְלַֽנַּעֲרָה֙) לֹא־תַעֲשֶׂ֣ה דָבָ֔ר, [wə·lan·na·‘ar] (wə·lan·na·‘ă·rāh) lō- ṯa-‘ă-śeh ḏā-ḇār,, '(But [to] the young woman) you shall not do anything;' – WLC
τη δε νεάνιδι ου ποιήσετε ουδέν, 'but to the young woman you shall not do anything,' – ABP
omitted – LXX^{Swete} Brenton

Deuteronomy 22:26

אֵ֥ין [לַנַּעַר כ] (לַֽנַּעֲרָ֖ה ק) חֵ֣טְא מָ֑וֶת כִּ֡י כַּאֲשֶׁר֩ כִּ֡י, ’ên [lan·na·‘ar] (lan·na·‘ă·rāh) ḥêṭ mā·weṯ; kî, '[there is] not [to] (the young woman) a sin [worthy] of death. For' – WLC
ουκ έστι τη νεάνιδι αμάρτημα θανάτου. ότι ως, 'there is not to the young woman a sin [worthy] of death. For as' – ABP
καὶ τῇ νεάνιδι οὐκ ἔστιν ἁμάρτημα θανάτου. ὡς, 'and to the young woman there is no sin [worthy] of death. As' – LXX^{Swete} Brenton

Deuteronomy 22:28, see also Rape in the Hebrew Bible § Deuteronomy 22:28–29

כִּֽי־יִמְצָ֣א אִ֗ישׁ, kî- yim-ṣā ’îš,, 'If a man finds' – WLC
Ἐὰν δέ τις εὕρῃ, 'And if anyone finds' – LXX^{Swete} ABP Brenton

Deuteronomy 22:28, see also Rape in the Hebrew Bible § Deuteronomy 22:28–29

וּתְפָשָׂ֖הּ, ū-ṯə-p̄ā-śāh, 'and he seizes her' – WLC
και βιασάμενος αυτήν, 'and using force on her' – ABP
καὶ βιασάμενος, 'and using force or and [if] he should force [her]' – LXX^{Swete} Brenton

Deuteronomy 22:28, see also Rape in the Hebrew Bible § Deuteronomy 22:28–29

וְנִמְצָֽאוּ׃, wə-nim-ṣā-’ū., 'and [they] are found,' – WLC
καὶ εὑρεθῇ·, 'and [he] should be found' – LXX^{Swete} ABP Brenton

Deuteronomy 22:29, see also Rape in the Hebrew Bible § Deuteronomy 22:28–29

חֲמִשִּׁ֣ים כָּ֑סֶף, ḥă-miš-šîm kā-sep̄;, 'fifty of silver' – WLC
πεντήκοντα δίδραχμα αργυρίου, 'fifty double-drachmas of silver or fifty silver didrachms' – LXX^{Swete} ABP Brenton

Deuteronomy 22:29, see also Rape in the Hebrew Bible § Deuteronomy 22:28–29

לֹא־יוּכַ֥ל, lō- yū-ḵal, 'he shall not be permitted' – WLC
οὐ δυνήσεται, 'he will not be able' – LXX^{Swete} ABP Brenton

Deuteronomy 22:29, see also Rape in the Hebrew Bible § Deuteronomy 22:28–29

כָּל־יָמָֽיו׃ ס, kāl- yā-māw. s, 'all his days' – WLC
τὸν ἅπαντα χρόνον, 'at any time' – LXX^{Swete} ABP Brenton

Deuteronomy 22:30

λήψεται, 'shall take' – ABP Brenton (classical Greek spelling)
λήμψεται, 'shall take' – LXX^{Swete} (Koine Greek spelling)

Compare Songs 2:6.

Deuteronomy 22:30

συγκάλυμμα, 'skirt or marriage veil' – ABP Brenton
συνκάλυμμα, 'skirt' – LXX^{Swete}

=== Deuteronomy 28 ===
Deuteronomy 28:30, see also Rape in the Hebrew Bible § Deuteronomy 28

יִשְׁכָּבֶ֔נָּה, yiš-kā-ḇen-nāh,, 'will rape her' – Q
יִשְׁגָּלֶנָּה – K
ישכב – SP
ἕξει αὐτήν·, 'shall have/hold her' – LXX^{Swete} ABP Brenton

Deuteronomy 28:30, see also Rape in the Hebrew Bible § Deuteronomy 28

עמה, ‘am-māh, 'people' – SP
omitted – MT

=== Book of Joshua ===
==== Joshua 1 ====
Joshua 1:1

עֶ֣בֶד יְהוָ֑ה וַיֹּ֤אמֶר יְהוָה֙, 'e-ḇeḏ Yah-weh way-yō-mer Yah-weh, '[the] servant of Yahweh that Yahweh spoke' – WLC
εἶπεν Κύριος, '[the] Lord said' – LXX^{Swete} LXX^{Rahlfs} Brenton
δούλου κυρίου και είπε κύριος, '[the] servant of [the] lord and [the] lord said' – ABP
servi Domini, ut loqueretur Dominus, 'servant(s) of [the] Lord, so that [the] Lord might speak' – Vg^{Colunga&Turrado}

=== Judges 1 ===
Judges 1:18

Tischendorf's 1880 edition of the Septuagint, with Judges 1:18 stating that Judah did not 'inherit' Gaza, Ashkelon, Ekron nor Ashdod (Note: καὶ οὐκ ἐκληρονόμησεν Ἰούδας τὴν Γάζαν οὐδὲ τὰ ὅρια αὐτῆς, οὐδὲ τὴν Ἀσκάλωνα οὐδὲ τὰ ὅρια αὐτῆς, οὐδὲ τὴν Ἀκκαρὼν οὐδὲ τὰ ὅρια αὐτῆς, οὐδὲ τὴν Ἄζωτον οὐδὲ τὰ περισπόρια αὐτῆς. (Swete's Septuagint). The word 'οὐκ' means "not", 'ἐκληρονόμησεν' (related to the modern Greek verb κληρονομώ) means "inherit", and 'οὐδὲ' means "nor".)

According to the Hebrew Masoretic Text (MT) of Judges 1:18, "Also Judah took Gaza with the coast thereof, and Askelon with the coast thereof, and Ekron with the coast thereof." (King James Version). (Note: וַיִּלְכֹּ֤ד יְהוּדָה֙ אֶת־עַזָּ֣ה וְאֶת־גְּבוּלָ֔הּ וְאֶֽת־אַשְׁקְלֹ֖ון וְאֶת־גְּבוּלָ֑הּ וְאֶת־עֶקְרֹ֖ון וְאֶת־גְּבוּלָֽהּ׃. (Westminster Leningrad Codex).) However, the Greek Septuagint (LXX) renders Judges 1:18 as: "But Judas did not inherit Gaza nor her coasts, nor Ascalon nor her coasts, nor Accaron nor her coasts, nor Azotus nor the lands around it.' (Brenton's Septuagint Translation).

This contradiction has puzzled scholars, as not only does the Greek text add Ashdod (Azotus) to the list of cities, but it specifically denies that the Judahites conquered (literally "inherited") these cities, while the Hebrew text asserts that they did. Although English Bible translations have generally followed the Masoretic Text in saying the Judahites took the three cities, some scholars claim that the Greek version should be regarded as superior if the inhabitants of these four coastal cities are to be equated with "the people of the plains" in the next verse, who repelled the Judahites thanks to their iron chariots. The Septuagint may therefore 'correct' the Hebrew text, as other textual evidence also seems to indicate the towns did not fall to the Israelites until much later. Charles Ellicott noted that Josephus had a different solution, claiming in Antiquities of the Jews (volume 2, paragraph 4) that 'Askelon and Ashdod were taken in the war, but that Gaza and Ekron escaped, because their situation in the plains enabled them to use their chariots; yet in 3, § 1, he says that the Canaanites re-conquered Askelon and Ekron.'

=== Judges 15 ===
Judges 15:5

וַיַּבְעֶר־אֵשׁ֙ בַּלַּפִּידִ֔ים, way-yaḇ-‘er-’êš bal-lap-pî-ḏîm,, 'And [when he] had burnt fire on the torches / set the torches on fire' – WLC
καὶ ἐξέκαυσεν πῦρ ἐν ταῖς λαμπάσιν, 'and he inflamed/kindled fire in the torches/lamps' – LXX^{Swete} APB

=== Judges 18 ===
Judges 18:7

מִצִּ֣דֹנִ֔ים וְדָבָ֥ר אֵין־ לָהֶ֖ם עִם־ אָדָֽם׃, miṣ·ṣi·ḏō·nîm, wə·ḏā·ḇār ’ên-lā·hem ‘im-’ā·ḏām., 'from the Sidonians, and [there were] no ties/dealings/word with anyone / any man.' – WLC
Σιδωνίων, καὶ λόγον οὐκ ἔχουσιν πρὸς ἄνθρωπον., 'of the Sidonians, and no word was had/held to anyone / any man' – B LXX^{Swete} LXX^{Rahlfs} Brenton (ἔχουσι)
Σιδωνιων και..., 'from the Sidonians and had no relationship with the Arameans' – LXX^{mss}
από Σιδώνος και λόγος ουκ ην αυτοίς μετά Συρίας, '[away] from Sidon, and there was no word to them with Syria' – A APB
et procul a Sidone atque a cunctis hominibus separatum., 'and far away from Sidon and separated from all men/people.' Vg^{Colunga&Turrado}

See also Dan (ancient city) § Laish.

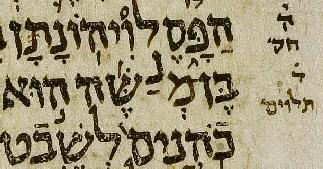
The superscripted נַ in Judges 18:30 on the name "Manasseh" in the Aleppo Codex

Judges 18:30

וִ֠יהֹונָתָן בֶּן־ גֵּרְשֹׁ֨ם בֶּן־ מְשֶּׁ֜ה, wî-hō-w-nā-ṯān ben-gê-rə-šōm ben-mō-šeh, 'and Jonathan the son of Gershom the son of Moses' – 'many Hebrew manuscripts, some Septuagint manuscripts and Vulgate'.
וִ֠יהֹונָתָן בֶּן־ גֵּרְשֹׁ֨ם בֶּן־ מְנַשֶּׁ֜ה, wî-hō-w-nā-ṯān ben-gê-rə-šōm ben-mə-naš-šeh, 'and Jonathan the son of Gershom the son of Manasseh' – 'many other Hebrew manuscripts and some other Septuagint manuscripts'
καὶ Ἰωναθὰμ υἱὸς Γηρσὸμ υἱὸς Μανασσή, 'and Jonatham, son Gersom, son Manasse' – LXX^{Swete}
και Ιωνάθαν υιός Γηρσών υιόυ Μανασσή, 'and Jonathan, son of the Gersoms of the son Manasse' – APB

"Moses" (משה) is thought to be the original reading, which was later changed to "Manasseh" in some manuscripts (but not all) by adding a nun in superscript (מ^{נ}שה), in order 'to avoid saying that the grandson of Moses became a priest of false gods'.
See also Judges 18 § Verse 30 and Gershom § Priestly connections.

=== Judges 19 ===
Judges 19:2, see also Levite's concubine

וַתִּזְנֶ֤ה עָלָיו֙ פִּֽילַגְשֹׁ֔ו wat-tiz-neh ‘ā-lāw pî-laḡ-šōw, (But his concubine was unfaithful to him, or But his concubine played the harlot against him, or But his concubine was angry at him,) – WLC

It is disputed whether the first word is derived from זנה zaná (H2181 "to commit fornication/adultery/harlotry, to be a harlot, to play the harlot, to prostitute"), or זנח zanákh (H2186 "to reject, spurn, be angry with/at, cast away (off), remove far away (off), desert"). Traditionally, translators and interpreters have followed the former verb, but some modern scholars prefer the latter verb because this meaning aligns much better with the Greek texts.

καὶ ἐπορεύθη ἀπ᾽ αὐτοῦ ἡ παλλακὴ αὐτοῦ (And his concubine departed from him) – LXX^{Swete} Brenton
και ωργίσθη αυτώ η παλλακή αυτού (And his concubine provoked him to anger) – ABP
quæ reliquit eum, 'who left him' – Vg^{Clement} Vg^{Colunga&Turrado}

Judges 19:2, see also Levite's concubine

καὶ ἀπῆλθεν παρ᾽ αὐτοῦ εἰς οἶκον πατρὸς αὐτῆς (and went away from him to the house of her father) – LXX^{Swete}
καὶ ἀπῆλθε παρ᾽ αὐτοῦ εἰς οἶκον πατρὸς αὐτῆς (and went away from him to the house of her father) – Brenton
και απήλθε απ' αυτού εις τον οίκον του πατρός αυτής (and she went forth from him unto the house of her father) – ABP
et reversa est in domum patris sui, 'and [has] returned to the house of her father' – Vg^{Clement} Vg^{Colunga&Turrado}

Judges 19:2, see also Levite's concubine

וַתְּהִי־שָׁ֕ם יָמִ֖ים אַרְבָּעָ֥ה חֳדָשִֽׁים׃ wat-tə-hî- šām yā-mîm ’ar-bā-‘āh ḥo-ḏā-šîm. (and was there the days of four months) – WLC
καὶ ἦν ἐκεῖ ἡμέρας δ᾽ μηνῶν (and [she] was there days and months) – LXX^{Swete}
καὶ ἦν ἐκεῖ ἡμέρας μηνῶν τεσσαρων (and she was there four months) – Brenton
και εγένετο εκεί ημέρας τετράμηνον (and she was there the days of four months) – ABP
mansitque apud eum quatuor mensibus, 'and she [has] remained near him / at his place during four months' – Vg^{Clement} Vg^{Colunga&Turrado}

Judges 19:3, see also Levite's concubine

ὀπίσω (after) – LXX^{Swete} Brenton
κατόπισθεν (after or behind) – ABP
Secutusque est, 'And [he has] followed' – Vg^{Clement} Vg^{Colunga&Turrado}

Judges 19:3, see also Levite's concubine

τοῦ λαλῆσαι ἐπὶ καρδίαν αὐτῆς (to speak unto her heart) – LXX^{Swete} Brenton
του λαλήσαι επί την καρδίαν αυτής (to speak unto the heart of her) – ABP
volens reconciliari ei, atque blandiri, 'wanting to reconcile [her] to him, and to flatter [her]' – Vg^{Clement} Vg^{Colunga&Turrado}

Judges 19:3, see also Levite's concubine

לַהֲשִׁיבֹו la-hă-šî-ḇōw, ([and] bring him back) – K
לַהֲשִׁיבָ֔הּ la-hă-šî-ḇāh, ([and] bring her back) – Q
τοῦ ἐπιστρέψαι αὐτὴν αὐτῷ (to turn her over to him) – LXX^{Swete} Brenton. ἐπιστρέψαι is a probable misspelling of ἐπιτρέπω
του διαλλάξαι αυτήν (to reconcile her or to change her mind) – ABP
et secum reducere, 'and to return [her] to him' – Vg^{Clement} Vg^{Colunga&Turrado}

Judges 19:3, see also Levite's concubine

וְנַעֲרֹ֥ו עִמֹּ֖ו וְצֶ֣מֶד חֲמֹרִ֑ים wə-na-‘ă-rōw ‘im-mōw wə-ṣe-meḏ ḥă-mō-rîm; (and [having his] young man/boy/servant with [him] and a pair of donkeys) – WLC
καὶ νεανίας αὐτοῦ μετ᾽ αὐτοῦ καὶ ζεῦγος ὄνων. (And his young man [was] with him and a pair of donkeys or and he had his young man with him, and a pair of asses) – LXX^{Swete} Brenton
και το παιδάριον αυτού μετ᾽ αυτού καὶ ζεύγος υποζυγίων. (And his little boy [was] with him and a pair of beasts of burden) – ABP
habens in comitatu puerum et duos asinos:, 'having a boy and two donkeys in his company:' – Vg^{Clement} Vg^{Colunga&Turrado}

Judges 19:3, see also Levite's concubine

καὶ ἥδε εἰσήνεγκεν αὐτὸν εἰς οἶκον (and she brought him into the house) – LXX^{Swete} Brenton. εἰσήνεγκεν = εἰς ("into" or "to(wards)") + φέρω ("to bring") aorist third person singular
και επορεύθη έως οίκου (and he went/travelled unto/until the house) – ABP
quæ suscepit eum, et introduxit in domum patris sui, 'who received him, and introduced [him] into her father's house' – Vg^{Clement} Vg^{Colunga&Turrado}

Judges 19:4, see also Levite's concubine

וַיֶּחֱזַק־ בּ֤וֹ way-ye-ḥĕ-zaq- bōw (detained/restrained him or persuaded him to stay) – WLC
κατέσχεν αὐτὸν (constrained him) – LXX^{Swete} Brenton
εισήγαγεν αυτόν (brought him in) – ABP
amplexatus est hominem, 'embraced the man' – Vg^{Clement} Vg^{Colunga&Turrado}

Judges 19:4, see also Levite's concubine

ἐπὶ (for or during) – LXX^{Swete} Brenton
omitted – WLC ABP Vg^{Clement} Vg^{Colunga&Turrado}

Judges 19:4, see also Levite's concubine

וַיָּלִ֖ינוּ way-yā-lî-nū ([they] lodged) – WLC
ηὐλίσθησαν ([they] spent the night or lodged) – LXX^{Swete} Brenton
ύπνωσαν ([they] slept) – ABP
omitted – Vg^{Clement} Vg^{Colunga&Turrado}

Judges 19:18, see also Levite's concubine

וְאֶת־בֵּ֤ית יְהוָה֙ אֲנִ֣י הֹלֵ֔ךְ wə-’eṯ- bêṯ Yah-weh ’ă-nî hō-lêḵ, (and [now] to the house of Yahweh I am going) – WLC Syriac Targum
καὶ εἰς τὸν οἶκόν μου ἐγὼ πορεύομαι· (and to my house I am walking) – LXX^{Swete} Brenton
και εις τον οίκον μου εγώ αποτρέχω (and to my house I am returning) – ABP. αποτρέχω is a probable misspelling of wikt:ἀποτρέπω
et nunc vadimus ad domum Dei, 'and now we are going to the house of God' – Vg^{Clement} Vg^{Colunga&Turrado}

Judges 19:24, see also Levite's concubine

הִנֵּה֩ בִתִּ֨י הַבְּתוּלָ֜ה hin-nêh ḇit-tî hab-bə-ṯū-lāh (Behold my virgin daughter) – WLC
ἴδε ἡ θυγάτηρ μου ἡ παρθένος (Behold [singular] the daughter of mine, the virgin) – LXX^{Swete} Brenton
ιδού θυγάτηρ μου η παρθένος (Behold [plural] my daughter, the virgin) – ABP
Habeo filiam virginem, 'I have a virgin daughter' – Vg^{Clement} Vg^{Colunga&Turrado}

Judges 19:24, see also Levite's concubine

אֹוצִֽיאָה־נָּ֤א אֹותָם֙ וְעַנּ֣וּ אֹותָ֔ם ’ō-w-ṣî-’āh- nā wə-‘an-nū ’ō-w-ṯām, (Let me bring them out now, and you rape/force [sexually]/defile/violate/ravish/mistreat/humble/humiliate them) – WLC
ἐξάξω αὐτάς, καὶ ταπεινώσατε αὐτὰς (And I will bring them out, and you humble/humiliate them,) – LXX^{Swete} Brenton ABP
educam eas ad vos, ut humilietis eas, 'I will lead them out to you, so that you humiliate them' – Vg^{Clement} Vg^{Colunga&Turrado}

Judges 19:24, see also Levite's concubine

וְלָאִ֤ישׁ הַזֶּה֙ לֹ֣א תַעֲשׂ֔וּ דְּבַ֖ר הַנְּבָלָ֥ה הַזֹּֽאת׃ wə-lā-’îš haz-zeh lō ṯa-‘ă-śū, də-ḇar han-nə-ḇā-lāh haz-zōṯ. (but unto this man do not so vile a thing (KJV) or but to this man do not commit this rape/folly/villainy/foolishness or vile/disgraceful act/thing/outrage) WLC
καὶ τῷ ἀνδρὶ τούτῳ οὐ ποιήσετε τὸ ῥῆμα τῆς ἀφροσύνης ταύτης. (but to this man you do not do this folly) – LXX^{Swete}
και τω ανδρί τούτω μη ποιήσητε το ρήμα της αφροσύνης ταύτης. (but to this man you should not do the thing of this folly or but to this man do not this folly) – Brenton ABP
ne scelus hoc contra naturam operemini in virum., 'do not work this crime against nature on a man.' – Vg^{Clement} Vg^{Colunga&Turrado}

Judges 19:25, see also Levite's concubine

וַיֵּדְע֣וּ אֹ֠ותָהּ וַיִּֽתְעַלְּלוּ־בָ֤הּ כָּל־הַלַּ֙יְלָה֙ עַד־הַבֹּ֔קֶר way-yê-ḏə-‘ū ’ō-w-ṯāh way-yiṯ-‘al-lə-lū- ḇāh kāl- hal-lay-lāh ‘aḏ- hab-bō-qer, (And they knew / had sexual relations with / raped her, and they mocked//abused/dealt severely with her the entire night until morning) – WLC
καὶ ἔγνωσαν αὐτήν, καὶ ἐνέπαιζον ἐν αὐτῇ ὅλην τὴν νύκτα ἕως πρωί (And they knew / had sex with / raped her, and they mocked/ridiculed/abused her the entire night until morning) – LXX^{Swete}
καὶ ἔγνωσαν αὐτήν, καὶ ἐνέπαιζον ἐν αὐτῇ ὅλην τὴν νύκτα ἕως τοπρωί (And they knew / had sex with / raped her, and they mocked/ridiculed/abused her the entire night until the morning) – Brenton
και έγνωσαν αυτήν και ενέπαιξαν αυτή όλην την νύκτα έως τοπρωϊ (And they knew / had sex with / raped her and mocked/ridiculed/abused her the entire night until the morning) – ABP
qua cum tota nocte abusi essent,, 'and when she had been abused all night,' – Vg^{Clement} Vg^{Colunga&Turrado}

Judges 19:25, see also Levite's concubine

וַֽיְשַׁלְּח֖וּהָ בעלות הַשָּֽׁחַר׃ way-šal-lə-ḥū-hā ba-‘ă-lō-wṯ haš-šā-ḥar. (and when they let her go, the day began to spring.) – K
וַֽיְשַׁלְּח֖וּהָ כַּעֲלֹ֥ות הַשָּֽׁחַר׃ way-šal-lə-ḥū-hā ka-‘ă-lō-wṯ haš-šā-ḥar. (and when they let her go, the day began to break.) – Q
καὶ ἐξαπέστειλαν αὐτὴν ὡς ἀνέβη τὸ πρωί. (and let her go when the morning dawned.) – LXX^{Swete} Brenton
και εξαπέστειλαν αυτήν άμα τω ανέβη τον όρθρον (and they sent her away at the same time the daybreak ascended.) – ABP
dimiserunt eam mane., 'they let her go in the morning.' – Vg^{Clement} Vg^{Colunga&Turrado}

Judges 19:28, see also Levite's concubine

וַיֹּ֧אמֶר אֵלֶ֛יהָ way-yō-mer ’ê-le-hā (And he said to her) – WLC
καὶ εἶπεν πρὸς αὐτήν (And he said to her) – LXX^{Swete}
και είπε προς αυτήν (And he said to her) – Brenton ABP
Cui ille, putans eam quiescere, loquebatur:, 'To whom he, believing her to be resting/asleep, said:' – Vg^{Clement} Vg^{Colunga&Turrado}

Judges 19:28, see also Levite's concubine

וְאֵ֣ין עֹנֶ֑ה wə-’ên ‘ō-neh; (But [she] did not answer.) – WLC
καὶ οὐκ ἀπεκρίθη, ὅτι ἦν νεκρά. (And she did not answer, because she was dead.) – LXX^{Swete} Brenton
και ουκ απεκρίθη αυτώ αλλά τεθνήκει (And she did not answer to him, for she had died) – ABP Brenton
Qua nihil respondente, intelligens quod erat mortua, 'As she was responding nothing, understanding that she was dead' – Vg^{Clement} Vg^{Colunga&Turrado}

Judges 19:28, see also Levite's concubine

τὸν ὄνον (the donkey) – LXX^{Swete} Brenton
το υποζύγιον (the beast of burden) – ABP

Judges 19:29, see also Levite's concubine

וַיָּבֹ֣א אֶל־בֵּ way-yā-ḇō ’el- bê-ṯōw, (And when he entered into his house) – WLC
και εισήλθεν εις τον οίκον αυτού (And he entered into his house) – ABP
Quam cum esset ingressus, 'When he had entered' – Vg^{Clement} Vg^{Colunga&Turrado}
omitted – LXX^{Swete} Brenton

Judges 19:29, see also Levite's concubine

הַֽמַּאֲכֶ֙לֶת֙ ham-ma-’ă-ḵe-leṯ (a knife) – WLC. A מאכלת (ma'akhélet) was a "knife for slaughtering, butchering, carving"
τὴν ῥομφαίαν (a rhomphaia or his sword) – LXX^{Swete} Brenton
την μάχαιραν (a makhaira or the knife) – ABP
gladium, 'a gladius or a sword' – Vg^{Clement} Vg^{Colunga&Turrado}

Judges 19:29, see also Levite's concubine

ἐκράτησεν (seized) – LXX^{Swete}
ἐκράτησε (seized) – Brenton
επελάβετο (took hold of) – ABP

Judges 19:29, see also Levite's concubine

לַעֲצָמֶ֔יהָ la-‘ă-ṣā-me-hā, (limb by limb) – WLC
κατά τα όστα αυτής (according to her bones) – ABP
cum ossibus suis, '(along) with her bones' – Vg^{Clement} Vg^{Colunga&Turrado}
omitted – LXX^{Swete} Brenton

Judges 19:29, see also Levite's concubine

בְּכֹ֖ל גְּב֥וּל יִשְׂרָאֵֽל׃ bə-ḵōl gə-ḇūl yiś-rā-’êl. (throughout the territory of Israel) – WLC
ἐν παντὶ ὁρίῳ Ἰσραήλ (to all borders of Israel or to every coast of Israel) – LXX^{Swete} Brenton
εις πάσας τας φυλάς Ισραήλ (to all the tribes of Israel) – ABP
in omnes terminos Israel, 'to all the borders of Israel' – Vg^{Clement} Vg^{Colunga&Turrado}

=== Judges 20 ===
Judges 20:03, see also Levite's concubine

וַיֹּֽאמְרוּ֙, way-yō-mə-rū, 'and said' – WLC
καὶ ἐλθόντες εἶπαν, 'and the arriving said' – LXX^{Swete} Brenton
και είπαν, 'and said' – ABP
Interrogatusque, 'And when he was questioned' – Vg^{Clement} Vg^{Colunga&Turrado}

Judges 20:05, see also Levite's concubine

אֹותִי֙ דִּמּ֣וּ לַהֲרֹ֔ג, ’ō-w-ṯî dim-mū la-hă-rōḡ,, 'they planned/intended to kill me' – WLC
ἐμὲ ἠθέλησαν φονεῦσαι, 'they wanted to murder/slay me' – LXX^{Swete} Brenton
εμέ ηθέλησαν αποκτείναι, 'they wanted to kill me' – ABP
volentes me occidere, 'wanting to kill me' – Vg^{Clement} Vg^{Colunga&Turrado}

Judges 20:05, see also Levite's concubine

וְאֶת־פִּילַגְשִׁ֥י עִנּ֖וּ וַתָּמֹֽת׃, wə-’eṯ- pî-laḡ-šî ‘in-nū wat-tā-mōṯ., 'and / but instead they raped/[sexually] forced/defiled/violated/ravished/mistreated/humbled/humiliated my concubine, and she died' – WLC
καὶ τὴν παλλακήν μου ἐταπείνωσαν, καὶ ἀπέθανεν., 'and they humiliated my concubine, and she died.' – LXX^{Swete}
καὶ τὴν παλλακήν μου ἐταπείνωσαν, καὶ ἀπέθανε., 'and they humiliated my concubine, and she died.' – Brenton
και την παλλακήν μου εταπείνωσαν και ενέπαιξαν αυτή και απέθανεν., 'and they humiliated my concubine, and they mocked/ridiculed/abused her, and she died.' – ABP
et uxorem meam incredibili furore libidinis vexantes, denique mortua est., 'and tormenting my wife with an incredible fury of lust, she (has) finally died.' – Vg^{Clement} Vg^{Colunga&Turrado}

=== Judges 21 ===
Judges 21:10, see also Levite's concubine

וְהַנָּשִׁ֖ים וְהַטָּֽף׃, wə-han-nā-šîm wə-haṭ-ṭāp̄., 'and [even] the women and the children.' – WLC
και τας γυναίκας και τον λαόν, 'even the women and the people!' – ABP
tam uxores quam parvulos eorum., 'both their wives and their little ones.' – Vg^{Colunga&Turrado}
omitted – LXX^{Swete} Brenton

Judges 21:11, see also Levite's concubine

וְזֶ֥ה הַדָּבָ֖ר אֲשֶׁ֣ר תַּעֲשׂ֑וּ, wə-zeh had-dā-ḇār ’ă-šer ta-‘ă-śū;, 'And this word you shall do:' – WLC
καὶ τοῦτο ποιήσετε·, 'And this you shall do:' – LXX^{Swete} Brenton
και ούτος ο λόγος ον ποιήσετε, 'And this [is] the word which you shall do' – ABP
Et hoc erit quod observare debebitis, 'And this will be what you will have to observe' – Vg^{Colunga&Turrado}

Judges 21:11, see also Levite's concubine

כָּל־זָכָ֗ר וְכָל־אִשָּׁ֛ה יֹדַ֥עַת מִשְׁכַּב־זָכָ֖ר תַּחֲרִֽימוּ׃, kāl- zā-ḵār, wə-ḵāl ’iš-šāh yō-ḏa-‘aṯ miš-kaḇ- zā-ḵār ta-ḥă-rî-mū., 'any male and any woman who has known the bed of a male you shall destroy/devote.' – WLC
πᾶν ἄρσεν καὶ πᾶσαν γυναῖκα εἰδυῖαν κοίτην ἄρσενος ἀναθεματιεῖτε,, 'Every male and every female having known the marriage-bed of a man you shall devote [to destruction],' – LXX^{Swete} Brenton
παν αρσενικόν και πάσαν γυναίκα γινώσκουσαν κοίτην άρσενος αναθεματιείτε, 'Every male and every woman knowning the marriage-bed of a man you shall devote to consumption.' – ABP
omne generis masculini, et mulieres quae cognoverunt viros, interficite;, 'every kind of male, and women who have known men, kill;' – Vg^{Colunga&Turrado}

Compare Numbers 31:17.

Judges 21:11, see also Levite's concubine

, τὰς δὲ παρθένους περιποιήσεσθε. καὶ ἐποίησαν οὕτως·, ', but take care of the virgins. And they did so;' – LXX^{Swete}
· τὰς δὲ παρθένους περιποιήσεσθε· καὶ ἐποίησαν οὕτως., '; but the virgins ye shall save alive: and they did so.' – Brenton
; virgines autem reservate., '; but save the virgins.' – Vg^{Colunga&Turrado}
omitted – WLC ABP

Compare Numbers 31:18.

Judges 21:12, see also Levite's concubine

נַעֲרָ֣ה בְתוּלָ֔ה אֲשֶׁ֧ר לֹֽא־יָדְעָ֛ה אִ֖ישׁ לְמִשְׁכַּ֣ב זָכָ֑ר, na-‘ă-rāh ḇə-ṯū-lāh, ’ă-šer lō- yā-ḏə-‘āh ’îš lə-miš-kaḇ zā-ḵār;, 'virgin young woman, who has not known a man on/in the bed of a male;' – WLC
νεάνιδας παρθένους, αἵτινες οὐκ ἔγνωσαν ἄνδρα εἰς κοίτην ἄρσενος,, 'virgin young women, whoever knew not a man, into the marriage-bed of a male.' – LXX^{Swete} Brenton
νεάνιδας παρθένους αι οὐκ έγνωσαν άνδρα εις κοίτην άρσενος, 'virgin young women, the ones [that] knew not a man, in the marriage-bed of a male.' – ABP
virgines, quae nescierunt viri thorum:, 'virgins, who did not know the marriage-bed of a man:' – Vg^{Colunga&Turrado}

Judges 21:12, see also Levite's concubine

שִׁלֹ֔ה אֲשֶׁ֖ר, ši-lōh, ’ă-šer, 'Shiloh which [is]' – WLC
Σηλὼν τὴν, 'Selon the [one]' – LXX^{Swete}
Σηλὼμ τὴν, 'Selom the [one]' – Brenton
Σηλώ η εστιν, 'Selo which is' – ABP
Silo, 'Silo' – Vg^{Colunga&Turrado}

Judges 21:14, see also Levite's concubine

וַיָּ֤שָׁב בִּנְיָמִן֙ בָּעֵ֣ת, way-yā-šāḇ bin-yā-min bā-‘êṯ, 'And Benjamin returned at that time' – WLC
καὶ ἐπέστρεψεν βενιαμεὶν πρὸς τοὺς υἱοὺς Ἰσραὴλ ἐν τῷ καιρῷ ἐκείνῳ, 'And Benjamin returned to the sons of Israel at that time' – LXX^{Swete} Brenton ABP
Veneruntque filii Benjamin in illo tempore, 'And the sons of Benjamin came at that time' – Vg^{Colunga&Turrado}

Judges 21:14, see also Levite's concubine

הַהִ֔יא וַיִּתְּנ֤וּ לָהֶם֙, ha-hî way-yit-tə-nū lā-hem, 'and they gave them' – WLC
καὶ ἔδωκαν αὐτοῖς οἱ υἱοὶ Ἰσραὴλ, 'and the sons of Israel gave them' – LXX^{Swete} Brenton
και έδωκαν αυτοίς, 'and [they] gave them' – ABP
et datae sunt eis, 'and to them were given' – Vg^{Colunga&Turrado}

Judges 21:14, see also Levite's concubine

הַנָּשִׁ֔ים אֲשֶׁ֣ר חִיּ֔וּ מִנְּשֵׁ֖י יָבֵ֣שׁ גִּלְעָ֑ד, han-nā-šîm, ’ă-šer ḥî-yū, min-nə-šê yā-ḇêš gil-‘āḏ;, 'the women, whom they had kept/saved alive, from the women of Jabesh Gilead;' – WLC
τὰς γυναῖκας ἃς ἐζωοποίησαν ἀπὸ τῶν θυγατέρων Ἰαβεὶς Γαλαάδ·, 'the women whom they saved alive from the daughters of Jabeis Galaad' – LXX^{Swete}
τὰς γυναῖκας ἃς ἐζωοποίησαν ἀπὸ τῶν θυγατέρων Ἰαβὶς Γαλαάδ·, 'the women whom they [had] saved alive of the daughters of Jabis Galaad' – Brenton
τας γυναίκας αίτινες ήσαν εκ των γυναικών Ιαβίς Γαλαάδ, 'the women whomever were of the women of Jabis Galaad' – ABP
uxores de filiabus Jabes Galaad:, '(the) wives of/from (the) daughters of Jabes Galaad:' – Vg^{Colunga&Turrado}

Judges 21:14, see also Levite's concubine

וְלֹֽא־מָצְא֥וּ לָהֶ֖ם כֵּֽן׃, wə-lō- mā-ṣə-’ū lā-hem kên., 'but [they] had not found enough for them.' – WLC
καὶ ἤρεσεν αὐτοῖς οὕτως., 'and it pleased them thus' – LXX^{Swete} Brenton ABP
καὶ ἤρεσεν αὐτοῖς οὕτω., 'and they were content' – Brenton
alias autem non repererunt, quas simili modo traderent., 'but [they] did not find others, whom [they] would deliver in (a) similar manner.' – Vg^{Colunga&Turrado}

Judges 21:17, see also Levite's concubine

לֹֽא־יִמָּחֶ֥ה שֵׁ֖בֶט מִיִּשְׂרָאֵֽל׃, lō- yim-mā-ḥeh šê-ḇeṭ mî-yiś-rā-’êl., 'a tribe may not be destroyed from Israel.' – WLC
οὐκ ἐξαλειφθήσεται φυλὴ ἀπὸ Ἰσραήλ., 'no tribe will be wiped away from Israel.' – LXX^{Swete} Brenton
ου μη εξαλειφθή φυλή εξ Ισραήλ, 'in no way should a tribe be wiped away out of Israel' – ABP
ne una tribus deleatur ex Israel, 'lest one tribe be destroyed/deleted from Israel' – Vg^{Colunga&Turrado}

Judges 21:22, see also Levite's concubine

לרוב, lā-rō-wḇ, 'to complain' – K
לָרִ֣יב ׀, lā-rîḇ, 'to complain' – Q

Judges 21:22, see also Levite's concubine

אֵלֵ֗ינוּ, ’ê-lê-nū,, 'to us' – WLC
πρὸς ὑμᾶς, 'to you' – LXX^{Swete}
πρὸς ημάς, 'to us' – Brenton ABP
adversum vos, 'against you' – Vg^{Colunga&Turrado}

Judges 21:22, see also Levite's concubine

חָנּ֣וּנוּ אֹותָ֔ם כִּ֣י לֹ֥א לָקַ֛חְנוּ אִ֥ישׁ אִשְׁתֹּ֖ו בַּמִּלְחָמָ֑ה, ḥān-nū-nū ’ō-w-ṯām, kî lō lā-qaḥ-nū ’îš ’iš-tōw bam-mil-ḥā-māh;, 'Be kind to them, because we did not take a woman/wife for [each] man in the war' – WLC
Ἔλεος ποιήσατε ἡμῖν αὐτάς, ὅτι οὐκ ἐλάβομεν ἀνὴρ γυναῖκα αὐτοῦ ἐν τῇ παρατάξει, 'Grant them to us out of mercy, for we have not taken every man a woman/wife for himself in the lines of battle' – LXX^{Swete} Brenton
ελεήσατε αυτούς ότι ουκ έλαβεν ανήρ εαυτώ γυναίκα εν τω πολέμω, 'Show mercy on them! For a man did not take a woman/wife to himself in the war' – ABP
Miseremini eorum: non enim rapuerunt eas jure bellantium atque victorum:, 'Have mercy on them: for [they] did not seize/abduct/rape them by (the) right of warriors and conquerors.' – Vg^{Colunga&Turrado}

Judges 21:25

בְּעֵינָ֖יו, bə-‘ê-nāw, 'in [his] eyes' – WLC
ἐνώπιον αὐτοῦ, 'in his face/view or in front of him' – LXX^{Swete} Brenton
εν οφθαλμοίς αυτού, 'in his eyes' – ABP
sibi videbatur, 'it seemed to him' – Vg^{Colunga&Turrado}

=== Books of Samuel ===
==== 2 Samuel 8 ====
2 Samuel 8:12

מֵאֲרָ֤ם, mê-'ă-rām, 'from Aram' – WLC AC
ἐκ τῆς Ἰδουμαίας, 'from Edom (Idumea)' – LXX^{Swete} LXX^{Rahlfs} Brenton
καὶ ἐκ τῆς Ἰδουμαίας, 'and from Edom (Idumea)' – ABP
de Syria, 'from Syria' – Vg^{Colunga&Turrado}

2 Samuel 8:12

וּמִפְּלִשְׁתִּ֖ים, ū-mip-pə-liš-tîm, 'and from the Philistines' – WLC
καὶ ἐκ τῶν ἀλλοφύλων, 'and from the foreigners' – LXX^{Swete} LXX^{Rahlfs} Brenton ABP
et Philisthiim, 'and [the] Philisthiim' – Vg^{Colunga&Turrado}

Compare 1 Kings 16:15.

2 Samuel 8:13

אֶת־אֲרָ֖ם, 'eṯ- 'ă-rām, 'of Aram' – WLC
τὴν Ἰδουμαίαν, 'Edom (Idumea)' – LXX^{Swete} LXX^{Rahlfs} Brenton ABP
Syria, 'Syria' – Vg^{Colunga&Turrado}

2 Samuel 8:13

בְּגֵיא־מֶ֑לַח, bə-ḡê- me-laḥ, 'in the valley [of] salt' – WLC
ἐν Γεβέλεμ, 'in Gebelem' – LXX^{Swete} Brenton ABP
ἐν Γαιμελε, 'in Gaimele' – LXX^{Rahlfs}
in valle Salinarum, 'in [the] valley of (the) Salts' – Vg^{Colunga&Turrado}

2 Samuel 8:18

כֹּהֲנִ֥ים, kō-hă-nîm, 'priests' – WLC. This noun is the origin of the surname Cohen.
αὐλάρχαι, 'chiefs/rulers/princes of the palace/court' – LXX^{Swete} LXX^{Rahlfs} Brenton ABP. This noun is a compound of αὐλή ("court(yard)" or "hall/chamber/house") and ἀρχή ("authority"), related to archon ("ruler" or "chief magistrate").
sacerdotes, 'priests' – Vg^{Colunga&Turrado}. Origin of the modern term sacerdotalism.

=== Books of Kings ===
==== 1 Kings 16 ====
1 Kings 16:15

בִּשְׁנַת֩ עֶשְׂרִ֨ים וָשֶׁ֜בַע שָׁנָ֗ה לְאָסָא֙ מֶ֣לֶךְ יְהוּדָ֔ה מָלַ֥ךְ זִמְרִ֛י, 'in the year twenty and seven year of Asa king of Judah, Zimri reigned' – WLC
Καὶ Ζαμβρεὶ ἐβασίλευσεν, 'And Zambreì reigned' – LXX^{Swete}
Καὶ Ζαμβρὶ ἐβασίλευσεν, 'And Zambrì reigned' – LXX^{Rahlfs} Brenton
εν τω εικοστώ και εβδόμω έτει Ασά βασιλέως Ιούδα εβασίλευσεν Ζιμβρί, 'in the twenty and seventh year of Asa king of Judah, Zimbrí reigned' – ABP
Anno vigesimo septimo Asa regis Juda, regnavit Zambri:, 'in the twenty-seventh year of Asa king of Judah, Zambri reigned:' – Vg^{Colunga&Turrado}

1 Kings 16:15

שִׁבְעַ֥ת יָמִ֖ים בְּתִרְצָ֑ה, šiḇ-'aṯ yā-mîm bə-ṯir-ṣāh;, 'seven days in Tirzah' – WLC
ἑπτὰ ἔτη ἐν Θερσά·, 'seven years in Thersá:' – LXX^{Swete}
ἑπτὰ ἡμέρας ἐν Θερσα., 'seven days in Thersa.' – LXX^{Rahlfs}
εν Θερσά ημέρας επτά, 'in Thersá days seven' – Brenton
εν Θερσά επτά ημέρας, 'in Thersá seven days' – ABP
septem diebus in Thersa:, 'seven days in Thersa:' – Vg^{Colunga&Turrado}

1 Kings 16:15

וְהָעָ֣ם חֹנִ֔ים, wə-hā-'ām ḥō-nîm, 'and the people [were] encamped' – WLC
καὶ ἡ παρεμβολὴ Ἰσραὴλ, 'and the camp of Israel' – LXX^{Swete} LXX^{Rahlfs} Brenton ABP
porro exercitus obsidebat, 'further (away), the army laid siege' – Vg^{Colunga&Turrado}

1 Kings 16:15

עַֽל־גִּבְּתֹ֖ון אֲשֶׁ֥ר לַפְּלִשְׁתִּֽים׃, 'al- gib-bə-ṯō-wn 'ă-šer lap-pə-liš-tîm., 'against Gibbethon which [belonged] to the Philistines.' – WLC
ἐπὶ Γαβαὼν τῶν ἀλλοφύλων., 'upon Gabaon of the foreigners.' – LXX^{Swete}. τῶν ἀλλοφύλων literally means 'of the [people] of another tribe'.
επί Γαβαθών την των αλλοφύλων, 'upon Gabathon the [city] of the foreigners.' – LXX^{Rahlfs} Brenton ABP
Gebbethon urbem Philisthinorum, '[upon] Gebbethon [the] city of the Philistines' – Vg^{Colunga&Turrado}

1 Kings 16:16

וַיִּשְׁמַ֤ע הָעָם֙ הַחֹנִ֣ים לֵאמֹ֔ר, way-yiš-ma' hā-'ām ha-ḥō-nîm lê-mōr, 'And the encamped people heard [it], saying' – WLC
καὶ ἤκουσεν ὁ λαὸς ἐν τῇ παρεμβολῇ λεγόντων, 'And the people in the camp heard [it], saying' – LXX^{Swete} LXX^{Rahlfs} Brenton ABP
Cumque audisset, 'And when [he/she/it] heard [it]' – Vg^{Colunga&Turrado}

1 Kings 16:16

קָשַׁ֣ר זִמְרִ֔י וְגַ֖ם הִכָּ֣ה אֶת־הַמֶּ֑לֶךְ, qā-šar zim-rî wə-ḡam hik-kāh 'eṯ- ham-me-leḵ, 'Zimi has conspired and also killed king' – WLC
Συνεστράφη Ζαμβρεὶ καὶ ἔπαισεν τὸν βασιλέα·, 'Zambreì conspired and struck the king;' – LXX^{Swete}
Συνεστράφη Ζαμβρι καὶ ἔπαισεν τὸν βασιλέα·, 'Zambri conspired and struck the king;' – LXX^{Rahlfs}
συνεστράφη Ζαμβρὶ καὶ ἔπαισε τὸν βασιλέα·, 'Zambrì conspired and struck the king;' – Brenton
συνεστράφη Ζαμβρί και έπαισε τον βασιλέα, 'Zambrí conspired and struck the king' – ABP
rebellasse Zambri, et occidisse regem,, '[that] Zambri had rebelled, and killed [the] king,' – Vg^{Colunga&Turrado}

1 Kings 16:16

אֶת־הַמֶּ֑לֶךְ, 'eṯ- 'ā-mə-rî, 'Omri' – WLC
τὸν Ζαμβρεί, 'Zambrei' – LXX^{Swete}
τὸν Αμβρι, 'Ambri' – LXX^{Rahlfs}
τὸν Ἀμβρὶ, 'Ambri' – Brenton
τον Αμβρί, 'Ambri' – ABP
Amri,, 'Amri,' – Vg^{Colunga&Turrado}

1 Kings 16:16

צָבָ֧א, ṣā-ḇā, 'of the army or of the war' – WLC
τῆς στρατείας, 'of the campaign/expedition' – LXX^{Swete}
τῆς στρατίας, 'of the army' – LXX^{Rahlfs} Brenton ABP
militiae, 'of the army or of the war/campaign' – Vg^{Colunga&Turrado}

1 Kings 16:17

עָמְרִ֛י וְכָל־יִשְׂרָאֵ֥ל עִמֹּ֖ו מִֽגִּבְּתֹ֑ון, 'ā-mə-rî wə-ḵāl yiś-rā-'êl 'im-mōw mig-gib-bə-ṯō-wn, 'Omri and all Israel with him from Gibbethon' – WLC
Ζαμβρεὶ καὶ πᾶς Ἰσραὴλ μετ᾽ αὐτοῦ ἐν Γαβαθὼν, 'Zambreì and all Israel with him in Gabathòn' – LXX^{Swete}
Αμβρι καὶ πᾶς Ισραηλ μετ' αὐτοῦ ἐκ Γαβαθων, 'Ambri and all Israel with him out of Gabathon' – LXX^{Rahlfs} Brenton
Αμβρί εκ Γαβαθών και πας Ισραήλ μετ' αυτού, 'Ambrí out of Gabathón and all Israel with him' – ABP
Amri, et omnis Israel cum eo, de Gebbethon,, 'Amri, and all Israel with him, from Gebbethon' – Vg^{Colunga&Turrado}

1 Kings 16:18

וַיָּבֹ֖א אֶל־אַרְמֹ֣ון בֵּית־הַמֶּ֑לֶךְ וַיִּשְׂרֹ֨ף עָלָ֧יו אֶת־בֵּֽית־מֶ֛לֶךְ בָּאֵ֖שׁ וַיָּמֹֽת׃, way-yā-ḇō 'el- 'ar-mō-wn bêṯ- ham-me-leḵ way-yiś-rōp̄ 'ā-lāw 'eṯ- bêṯ- me-leḵ bā-'êš way-yā-mōṯ., 'and [he] went into the citadel of the house of the king and burnt [down] the house [of the] king upon himself with fire and died.' – WLC
ἐνεπύρισεν ὁ βασιλεὺς ἐπ᾽ αὐτὸν τὸν οἶκον τοῦ βασιλέως, καὶ ἀπέθανεν·, 'the king himself set fire to the house of the king, and died;' – LXX^{Swete}
εἰσπορεύεται εἰς ἄντρον τοῦ οἴκου τοῦ βασιλέως καὶ ἐνεπύρισεν ἐπ' αὐτὸν τὸν οἶκον τοῦ βασιλέως ἐν πυρὶ και απέθανεν, '[he] entered into [the] inner room of the house of the king and [he] set fire to the house of the king over himself with fire and died' – LXX^{Rahlfs} ABP
πορεύεται εἰς άντρον του οίκου του βασιλέως, και ενεπύρισεν επ' αυτόν τον οίκον του βασιλέως, και απέθανεν, '[he] went into [the] inner room of the house of the king, and [he] set fire to the house of the king over himself, and died' – Brenton
ingressus est palatium, et succendit se cum domo regia: et mortuus est, '[he] entered [the] palace, and burnt himself with [the] royal house: and [he] died' – Vg^{Colunga&Turrado}

1 Kings 16:19

חטאתו, ḥaṭ-ṭā-ṯōw, 'of his sin' – K
חַטֹּאתָיו֙, ḥaṭ-ṭō-ṯāw, 'of his sins' – Q
τῶν ἁμαρτιῶν αὐτοῦ, 'of his sins' – LXX^{Swete} LXX^{Rahlfs} Brenton ABP
in peccatis suis, 'in his sins' – Vg^{Colunga&Turrado}

1 Kings 16:19

אֲשֶׁ֣ר עָשָׂ֔ה, 'ă-šer 'ā-śāh, 'which [he] did or (had) done/committed' – WLC
αις εποίησεν, 'which [he] did/committed' – ABP
quo fecit, 'which [he] did' – Vg^{Colunga&Turrado}
omitted – LXX^{Swete} LXX^{Rahlfs} Brenton

1 Kings 16:20

וְקִשְׁרֹ֖ו אֲשֶׁ֣ר קָשָׁ֑ר, wə-qiš-rōw 'ă-šer qā-šār, 'and the conspiracy which [he] conspired' – WLC
καὶ τὰς συνάψεις αὐτοῦ ἃς συνῆψεν, 'and his associations [he] joined in' – LXX^{Swete} LXX^{Rahlfs} Brenton ABP
et insidiarum ejus, et tyrannidis, 'and of his intrigues/plots, and tyranny' – Vg^{Colunga&Turrado}

1 Kings 16:21

תִבְנִ֤י בֶן־גִּינַת֙, ṯiḇ-nî ḇen- gî-naṯ, 'Tibni son of Ginath' – WLC
Θαμνεὶ υἱοῦ Γωνὰθ, 'Thamneì son of Gōnàth' – LXX^{Swete}
Θαμνι υἱοῦ Γωναθ, 'Thamni son of Gōnath' – LXX^{Rahlfs}
Θαμνὶ υἱοῦ Γωνὰθ, 'Thamnì son of Gōnàth' – Brenton
Θαβνί υιόυ Γινήθ, 'Thabní son of Ginḗth' – ABP
Thebni filium Gineth, 'Thebni son of Gineth' – Vg^{Colunga&Turrado}

1 Kings 16:21

עָמְרִֽי׃, 'ā-mə-rî., 'Omri.' – WLC
Ζαμβρεί., 'Zambrei.' – LXX^{Swete}
Αμβρι., 'Ambri.' – LXX^{Rahlfs}
Ἀμβρί., 'Ambri.' – Brenton
Αμβρί., 'Ambri.' – ABP
Amri., 'Amri.' – Vg^{Colunga&Turrado}

1 Kings 16:22

וַיֶּחֱזַ֤ק הָעָם֙ אֲשֶׁ֣ר אַחֲרֵ֣י עָמְרִ֔י אֶת־הָעָ֕ם אֲשֶׁ֥ר אַחֲרֵ֖י תִּבְנִ֣י בֶן־גִּינַ֑ת, way-ye-ḥĕ-zaq hā-'ām 'ă-šer 'a-ḥă-rê 'ā-mə-rî, 'eṯ- hā-'ām 'ă-šer 'a-ḥă-rê tiḇ-nî ḇen- gî-naṯ;, 'And/but the people who followed Omri prevailed against the people who followed Tibni son of Ginath' – WLC
καὶ ἡττήθη ὁ λαὸς ὁ ὢν ὀπίσω Θαμνεὶ υἱοῦ Γωνάθ·, 'And defeated was the people being after Thamneì son of Gōnàth:' – LXX.^{Swete} ἡττάομαι is an Attic variation of the verb ἡσσάομαι ("to be less/weaker than, to be defeated")
Ὁ λαὸς ὁ ὢν ὀπίσω Ἀμβρί υπερεκράτησε τον λαόν τον οπίσω Θαμνὶ υἱοῦ Γωνὰθ·, 'The people being after Ambri prevailed over the people being after Thamnì son of Gōnàth' – LXX^{Rahlfs} Brenton
και ο λαός ο ων οπίσω Αμβρί υπερεκράτησε τον λαόν τον οπίσω Θαβνί υιόυ Γινήθ, 'And the people being after Ambri prevailed over the people being after Thabní son of Ginḗth' – ABP
Praevaluit autem populus qui erat cum Amri, populo qui sequebatur Thebni filium Gineth:, 'But the people who were with Amri prevailed, over the people who followed Thebni son of Gineth:' – Vg^{Colunga&Turrado}

1 Kings 16:22

וַיָּ֣מָת תִּבְנִ֔י וַיִּמְלֹ֖ךְ עָמְרִֽי׃ פ, way-yā-māṯ tiḇ-nî, way-yim-lōḵ 'ā-mə-rî. p̄, 'And Tibni died, and Omri reigned.' – WLC
καὶ ἀπέθανεν Θαμνεὶ καὶ Ἰωρὰμ ὁ ἀδελφὸς αὐτοῦ ἐν τῷ καιρῷ ἐκείνῳ, καὶ ἐβασίλευσεν Ζαμβρεὶ μετὰ Θαμνεί., 'And Thamneì and Joram the brother of him died at that time, and Zambrei ruled after Thamneì.' – LXX^{Swete}
καὶ ἀπέθανεν Θαμνι καὶ Ιωραμ ὁ ἀδελφὸς αὐτοῦ ἐν τῷ καιρῷ ἐκείνῳ, καὶ ἐβασίλευσεν Αμβρι μετὰ Θαμνι., 'And Thamni and Joram the brother of him died at that time, and Ambri ruled after Thamni.' – LXX^{Rahlfs}
καὶ ἀπέθανε Θαμνὶ καὶ Ἰωρὰμ ὁ ἀδελφὸς αὐτοῦ ἐν τῷ καιρῷ ἐκείνῳ, καὶ ἐβασίλευσεν Ἀμβρί μετὰ Θαμνί., 'And Thamnì and Joram the brother of him died at that time, and Ambri ruled after Thamnì.' – Brenton
και απέθανε Θαβνί και εβασίλευσεν Αμβρί., 'And Thabní died and Ambri reigned.' – ABP
mortuusque est Thebni, et regnavit Amri., 'and Thebni died, and Amri reigned.' – Vg^{Colunga&Turrado}

1 Kings 16:28

וַיִּשְׁכַּ֤ב עָמְרִי֙ עִם־אֲבֹתָ֔יו וַיִּקָּבֵ֖ר בְּשֹׁמְרֹ֑ון וַיִּמְלֹ֛ךְ אַחְאָ֥ב בְּנֹ֖ו תַּחְתָּֽיו׃ פ – WLC
καὶ ἐκοιμήθη Ζαμβρεὶ μετὰ τῶν πατέρων αὐτοῦ, καὶ θάπτεται ἐν Σαμαρείᾳ· καὶ βασιλεύει Ἀχαὰβ υἱὸς αὐτοῦ ἀντ᾽ αὐτοῦ. – LXX^{Swete}
καὶ ἐκοιμήθη Αμβρι μετὰ τῶν πατέρων αὐτοῦ καὶ θάπτεται ἐν Σαμαρείᾳ, καὶ βασιλεύει Αχααβ υἱὸς αὐτοῦ ἀντ αὐτοῦ. – LXX^{Rahlfs}
Ἀμβρί., 'Ambri.' – Brenton
και εκοιμήθη Αμβρί μετά των πατέρων αυτού και θάπτεται εν Σαμαρεία και εβασίλευσεν Αχαάβ ο υιός αυτού αντ' αυτού – ABP
Dormivitque Amri cum patribus suis, et sepultus est in Samaria: regnavitque Achab filius ejus pro eo. – Vg^{Colunga&Turrado}

A long addition is found in the Septuagint of Codex Vaticanus following 1 Kings 16:28 (numbered as verses 28a–28h).

1 Kings 16:28a

[1] Καὶ ἐν τῷ ἐνιαυτῷ τῷ ἑνδεκάτῳ ἔτει τοῦ Ζαμβρεὶ βασιλεύει Ἰωσαφὰθ υἱὸς Ἀσά· βασιλεύει ἐτῶν τριάκοντα καὶ πέντε ἐν τῇ βασιλείᾳ αὐτοῦ, καὶ εἴκοσι πέντε ἔτη βασιλεύει ἐν Ἰερουσαλήμ· καὶ ὄνομα τῆς μητρὸς αὐτοῦ Γαβουζά, θυγάτηρ Σελεεί. – LXX^{Swete}
τοῦ Αμβρι...Ιωσαφατ υἱὸς Ασα ἐτῶν...ἐβασίλευσεν ἐν Ιερουσαλημ,...Γαζουβα θυγάτηρ Σελει. – LXX^{Rahlfs}
τοῦ Ἀμβρί...Ιωσαφατ υἱὸς Ασα ἐτῶν...εἴκοσιπέντε...ἐβασιλευσεν....Γαζουβά, θυγάτηρ Σελί· – Brenton
omitted – WLC ABP Vg^{Colunga&Turrado}

1 Kings 16:28b

[2] καὶ ἐπορεύθη ἐν τῇ ὁδῷ Ἀσὰ τοῦ πατρὸς αὐτοῦ, καὶ οὐκ ἐξέκλινεν ἀπ᾽ αὐτῆς τοῦ ποιεῖν τὸ εὐθὲς ἐνώπιον Κυρίου· πλὴν τῶν ὑψηλῶν οὐκ ἐξῆραν, ἔθυον ἐν τοῖς ὑψηλοῖς καὶ ἐθυμίων., 'And he went in the way of Asa his father, and he did not deviate from it to do what is right before the Lord; only they did not remove [any] of the high places, they sacrificed and burnt incense on the high places.' – LXX^{Swete} LXX^{Rahlfs} Brenton
omitted – WLC ABP Vg^{Colunga&Turrado}

1 Kings 16:28c

[3] καὶ ἃ συνέθετο Ἰωσαφάθ, καὶ πᾶσα δυναστεία ἣν ἐποίησεν, καὶ οὓς ἐπολέμησεν, οὐκ ἰδοὺ ταῦτα γεγραμμένα ἐν βιβλίῳ λόγων τῶν ἡμερῶν τῶν βασιλέων Ἰούδα;, 'And what Josaphat composed, and all dynasty which he made, and those who fought, are these [things] not written in the book of the words of the days of the kings of Judah?' – LXX^{Swete}
...Ιωσαφατ,...ἡ δυναστεία,... – LXX^{Rahlfs}
...Ἰωσαφάτ μετὰ βασίλεως Ἰσραὴλ,...ἐποίησε... – Brenton
omitted – WLC ABP Vg^{Colunga&Turrado}

1 Kings 16:28d

[4] καὶ τὰ λοιπὰ τῶν συμπλοκῶν ἃς ἐπέθεντο ἐν ταῖς ἡμέραις Ἀσὰ τοῦ πατρὸς αὐτοῦ ἐξῆρεν ἀπὸ τῆς γῆς. – LXX^{Swete} LXX^{Rahlfs} Brenton
omitted – WLC ABP Vg^{Colunga&Turrado}

1 Kings 16:28e

[5] καὶ βασιλεὺς οὐκ ἦν ἐν Συρίᾳ· νασεὶβ ὁ βασιλεύς. – LXX^{Swete}
...νασιβ. – LXX^{Rahlfs}
...Νασὶβ. – Brenton
omitted – WLC ABP Vg^{Colunga&Turrado}

1 Kings 16:28f

[6] ἐποίησεν ναῦν εἰς Θαρσεὶς πορεύεσθαι εἰς Σωφείρ, πορεύεσθαι ἐπὶ τὸ χρυσίον· καὶ οὐκ ἐπορεύθη, ὅτι συνετρίβη ἡ ναῦς ἐν Γασιὼν Γάβερ. – LXX^{Swete}
καὶ ὁ βασιλεὺς Ιωσαφατ ἐποίησεν...Θαρσις...Σωφιρ ἐπὶ...Γασιωνγαβερ. – LXX^{Rahlfs}
Καὶ ὁ βασιλεύς Ἰωσαφάτ ἐποίησε...Θαρσὶς...Σωφίρ ἐπὶ... – Brenton
omitted – WLC ABP Vg^{Colunga&Turrado}

1 Kings 16:28g

[7] τότε εἶπεν βασιλεὺς Ἰσραὴλ πρὸς Ἰωσαφάθ Ἐξαποστελῶ τοὺς παῖδάς σου καὶ τὰ παιδάριά μου ἐν τῇ νηί· καὶ οὐκ ἐβούλετο Ἰωσαφάθ. – LXX^{Swete}
...ὁ βασιλεὺς...Ἰωσαφάτ...Ἰωσαφάτ· – LXX^{Rahlfs} Brenton
omitted – WLC ABP Vg^{Colunga&Turrado}

1 Kings 16:28h

[8] καὶ ἐκοιμήθη Ἰωσαφὰθ μετὰ τῶν πατέρων αὐτοῦ ἐν πόλει Δαυείδ· καὶ ἐβασίλευσεν Ἰωρὰμ υἱὸς αὐτοῦ ἀντ᾽ αὐτοῦ., 'And Josaphàth slept with his fathers in the city of Daveíd: and Joram his son reigned instead of him.' – LXX^{Swete}
καὶ ἐκοιμήθη Ιωσαφατ μετὰ τῶν πατέρων αὐτοῦ καὶ θάπτεται μετὰ τῶν πατέρων αὐτοῦ ἐν πόλει Δαυιδ,..., 'And Josaphàt slept with his fathers and was buried with his fathers in the city of David,...' – LXX^{Rahlfs}
...Ἰωσαφάτ...Δαυίδ·..., '...Josaphàt...Davíd:...' – Brenton
omitted – WLC LXX^{Rahlfs} ABP Vg^{Colunga&Turrado}

1 Kings 16:29

וְאַחְאָ֣ב בֶּן־עָמְרִ֗י מָלַךְ֙ עַל־יִשְׂרָאֵ֔ל בִּשְׁנַ֨ת שְׁלֹשִׁ֤ים וּשְׁמֹנֶה֙ שָׁנָ֔ה לְאָסָ֖א מֶ֣לֶךְ יְהוּדָ֑ה וַ֠יִּמְלֹךְ אַחְאָ֨ב בֶּן־עָמְרִ֤י עַל־יִשְׂרָאֵל֙ בְּשֹׁ֣מְרֹ֔ון עֶשְׂרִ֥ים וּשְׁתַּ֖יִם שָׁנָֽה׃, 'And Ahab son of Omri [became] king over Israel in the year thirty and eight years of Asa king of Judah, and Ahab the son of Omri reigned over Israel in Samaria twenty and two years.' – WLC
Ἐν ἔτει δευτέρῳ τῷ Ἰωσαφὰθ βασιλεύει Ἀχαὰβ υἱὸς Ζαμβρεί· ἐβασίλευσεν ἐπὶ Ἰσραὴλ ἐν Σαμαρείᾳ εἴκοσι καὶ δύο ἔτη., 'In the second year of Josaphath reigned Achaáb son of Zambreí; [he] reigned over Israel in Samaria twenty and two years' – LXX^{Swete}
Ἐν ἔτει δευτέρῳ τῷ Ιωσαφατ βασιλεύει Αχααβ υἱὸς Αμβρι· ἐβασίλευσεν ἐπὶ Ισραηλ ἐν Σαμαρείᾳ εἴκοσι καὶ δύο ἔτη., 'In the second year of Josaphat reigned Achaab son of Ambri: [he] reigned over Israel in Samaria twenty and two years.' – LXX^{Rahlfs}
Ἐν ἔτει δευτέρῳ τοῦ Ἰωσαφὰτ βασιλέως Ἰούδα, Ἀχαὰβ υἱὸς Ἀμβρὶ ἐβασίλευσεν ἐπὶ Ἰσραὴλ ἐν Σαμαρείᾳ εἴκοσι καὶ δύο ἔτη., 'In the second year of Josaphat king of Judah, Achaáb son of Ambrì reigned over Israel in Samaria twenty and two years.' – Brenton
ο δε Αχαάβ υιός Αμβρί εβασίλευσεν επί Ισραήλ εν έτει τριακοστώ και ογδόω του Ασά βασιλέως Ιούδα βασιλεύει δε Αχαάβ υιός Αμβρί επί Ισραήλ εν Σαμαρεία είκοσι και δύο έτη, 'But Achaáb the son of Ambrí reigned over Israel in the thirtieth and eighth year of Asa king of Judah. And Achaáb the son of Ambrí reigned over Israel in Samaria for twenty and two years.' – ABP
Achab vero filius Amri regnavit super Israel anno trigesimo octavo Asa regis Juda. Et regnavit Achab filius Amri super Israel in Samaria viginti et duobus annis., 'Achab [the] real son of Amri reigned over Israel in (the) thirty-eighth year of Asa king of Judah. And Achab (the) son of Amri reigned over Israel in Samaria for twenty-two years.' – Vg^{Colunga&Turrado}

1 Kings 16:30

ἐπονηρεύσατο, '[he was] wicked' – LXX^{Swete} LXX^{Rahlfs}
και επονηρεύσατο, 'and [he was] wicked' – Brenton ABP
omitted – WLC Vg^{Colunga&Turrado}

1 Kings 16:31

τὴν Ἰεζάβελ θυγατέρα Ἰεθεβάαλ βασιλέως Σιδωνίων,, 'Iezábel daughter [of] Iethebáal king of the Sidonians,' – LXX^{Swete} LXX^{Rahlfs} Brenton
Ιεζάβελ την θυγατέρα Εθβαάλ βασιλέως Σιδωνείων, 'Iezábel the daughter [of] Ethbaál king of the Sidonians' – ABP

1 Kings 16:32

בֵּ֣ית הַבַּ֔עַל, bêṯ hab-ba-'al, '[the] house of Baal' – WLC
בית בעל, bêṯ ba-'al, 'house Baal' – Kennicott^{182}
ἐν οἴκῳ τῶν προσοχθισμάτων αὐτοῦ, 'in the house of his abominations' – LXX^{Swete} LXX^{Rahlfs} Brenton
εν οίκω του Βάαλ, 'in [the] house of Báal' – ABP
in templo Baal, 'in [the] temple [of] Baal' – Vg^{Colunga&Turrado}

1 Kings 16:33

וַיַּ֥עַשׂ אַחְאָ֖ב אֶת־הָאֲשֵׁרָ֑ה, way-ya-'aś 'aḥ-'āḇ 'eṯ- hā-'ă-šê-rāh;, 'And Ahab made a(n) [(wooden) image of] Asherah' – WLC
καὶ ἐποίησεν Ἀχαὰβ ἄλσος·, 'And Achaàb made/prepared [a/the] sacred grove:' – LXX^{Swete} LXX^{Rahlfs} Brenton
και εποίησεν Αχαάβ το άλσος, 'And Achaáb prepared the sacred grove' – ABP
et plantavit lucum:, 'and [he] planted [a] (sacred) grove:' – Vg^{Colunga&Turrado}

1 Kings 16:33

לְהַכְעִיס֙ אֶת־יְהֹוָה֙ אֱלֹהֵ֣י יִשְׂרָאֵ֔ל, lə-haḵ-'îs 'eṯ- Yah-weh 'ĕ-lō-hê yiś-rā-'êl, 'to provoke the anger of Yahweh [the] god [of] Israel' – WLC
παροργίσαι τὴν ψυχὴν αὐτοῦ, τοῦ ἐξολοθρευθήναι· ἐκακοποίησεν, 'to provoke the anger of his own life, so that he should be annihilated: he did evil' – LXX^{Swete}
παροργίσαι τὴν ψυχὴν αὐτοῦ τοῦ ἐξολεθρευθῆναι· ἐκακοποίησεν, 'to provoke the anger of his own life so that he should be destroyed: he did evil' – LXX^{Rahlfs}
παροργίσαι τον Κύριον Θεὸν τοῦ Ἰσραήλ, καὶ τὴν ψυχὴν αὐτοῦ ἐξολοθρευθῆναι, ἐκακοποίησεν, 'to provoke the anger of the Lord God of Israel, and of his own life so that he should be destroyed, he did evil' – Brenton
παροργίσαι τον κύριον θεόν του Ισραήλ, 'to provoke the anger of the lord god of Israel' – ABP
irritans Dominum Deum Israel, 'irritating [the] Lord God Israel' – Vg^{Colunga&Turrado}

1 Kings 16:34

בְּיָמָ֞יו בָּנָ֥ה חִיאֵ֛ל בֵּ֥ית הָאֱלִ֖י אֶת־יְרִיחֹ֑ה, bə-yā-māw bā-nāh ḥî-'êl bêṯ hā-'ĕ-lî 'eṯ- yə-rî-ḥōh, 'In his days Hiel [the] Bethelite built Jericho' – WLC
ᾨκοδόμησεν Ἀχειὴλ ὁ Βαιθηλείτης τὴν Ἰερειχώ·, 'Acheièl the Baithelite built Iereicho:' – LXX^{Swete}
ἐν ταῖς ἡμέραις αὐτοῦ ᾠκοδόμησεν Αχιηλ ὁ Βαιθηλίτης τὴν Ιεριχω·, 'In his days, Achiel the Baithelite built Iericho:' – LXX^{Rahlfs}
Καὶ ἐν ταῖς ἡμέραις αὐτοῦ ᾠκοδόμησεν Αχιὴλ ὁ Βαιθηλίτης τὴν Ἱεριχω·, 'And in his days, Achièl the Baithelite built Hiericho:' – Brenton
εν ταις ημέραις αυτού ωκοδόμησεν Χιήλ ο Βεθελίτης την Ιεριχώ, 'In his days, Chiél the Bethelite built Iericho' – ABP
In diebus ejus aedificavit Hiel de Bethel Jericho:, 'In his days Hiel of Bethel (has) built Jericho:' – Vg^{Colunga&Turrado}

1 Kings 16:34

וּבִשְׂגִיב, ū-ḇiś-ḡîḇ, 'and on Segub' – K
וּבִשְׂג֤וּב, ū-ḇiś-ḡūḇ, 'and with Segub' – Q
καὶ τῷ Ζεγοὺβ, 'and on Zegoùb' – LXX^{Swete}
καὶ τῷ Σεγουβ, 'and on Segoub' – LXX^{Rahlfs}
καὶ τῷ Σεγουβ, 'and on Segoùb' – Brenton
και εν τω Σεγούβ, 'and on Segoúb' – ABP
et in Segub, 'and on Segub' – Vg^{Colunga&Turrado}

=== Song of Songs ===
==== Song of Songs 1 ====
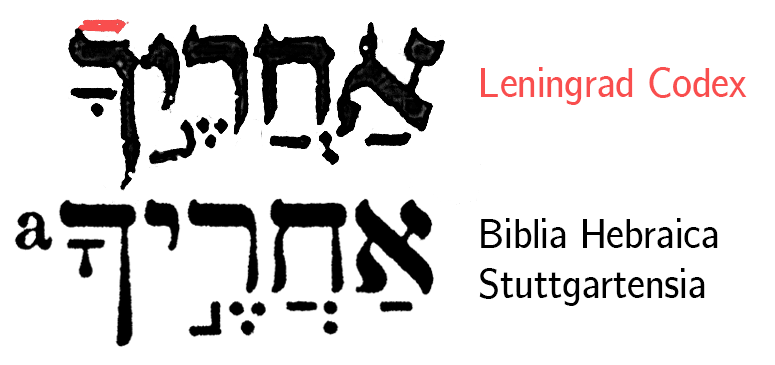
The word "אחריך", meaning "after you", from Song of Solomon 1:4a in the Leningrad Codex (hand-written) and in the Hebrew Bible print edition of the BHS (which omits the Rafe diacritic)

Songs 1:1

שִׁ֥יר הַשִּׁירִ֖ים אֲשֶׁ֥ר לִשְׁלֹמֹֽה׃, šîr haš-šî-rîm 'ă-šer liš-lō-mōh., '[The] song of songs that [is] of Shalomo' – WLC
ΑΣΜΑ ᾀσμάτων, ὅ ἐστιν τῷ Σαλωμών., 'SONG of songs, which is to Salomon.' – LXX^{Swete}
Ἆισμα ᾀσμάτων, ὅ ἐστιν τῷ Σαλωμων., 'Song of songs, which is to Salomon.' – LXX^{Rahlfs}
ΑΣΜΑ ᾀσμάτων, ὅ ἐστι τῷ Σαλωμών., 'SONG of songs, which is to Salomon.' – Brenton
άσμα ασμάτων ο εστι τω Σολομώντι, '[A] song of songs which is to Solomon.' – ABP
omitted – Vg^{Colunga&Turrado}. Note: because Vg omits the first verse, it has only 16 verses in this chapter; the numbering shifts backwards, so that verse 1:2 in Hebrew and Greek becomes verse 1:1 in Latin etc.

Songs 1:3

שֶׁ֖מֶן, še-men, 'ointment/oil' – WLC
μύρον, 'perfume/ointment' – LXX^{Swete} LXX^{Rahlfs} Brenton
μύρου, 'of perfume/ointment' – ABP
Oleum, 'Oil' – Vg^{Colunga&Turrado}

Songs 1:5

בְּנֹ֖ות יְרוּשָׁלִָ֑ם, bə-nō-wṯ yə-rū-šā-lim, 'O daughters of Jerusalem' – WLC
θυγατέρες Ἰσραήλ, 'O daughters of Israel' – LXX^{Swete}
θυγατέρες Ιερουσαλήμ, 'O daughters of Jerusalem' – LXX^{Rahlfs} Brenton ABP
filiae Jerusalem, '(O) daughters of Jerusalem or of/to (the) daughter Jerusalem or Jerusalem of/to [a/the] daughter' – Vg^{Colunga&Turrado}

Songs 1:5

δέρρις Σαλωμών., '[the] hide/leathern coverings/curtains of Salomon.' – LXX^{Swete}
δέρρεις Σαλωμων., '[the] hide/leathern coverings/curtains of Salomon.' – LXX^{Rahlfs} Brenton
δέρρεις Σολομώντος, '[the] hide/leathern coverings/curtains of Solomon.' – ABP

Songs 1:6

אַל־תִּרְא֙וּנִי֙ שֶׁאֲנִ֣י שְׁחַרְחֹ֔רֶת שֶׁשֱּׁזָפַ֖תְנִי הַשָּׁ֑מֶשׁ, 'al- tir-'ū-nî še-'ă-nî šə-ḥar-ḥō-reṯ, šeš-šĕ-zā-p̄aṯ-nî haš-šā-meš;, 'Do not look at [me], because I [am] blackened/swarthy, because the sun has seen / looked at [me];' – WLC
μὴ βλέψητέ με, ὅτι ἐγώ εἰμι μεμελανωμένη, ὅτι παρέβλεψέ(ν) με ὁ ἥλιος·, 'Do not look at me, because I am being blackened, because the sun has looked over me;' – LXX^{Swete} LXX^{Rahlfs} Brenton
...μελανωμένη..., '...blackened...' – ABP
Nolite me considerare quod fusca sim, quia decoloravit me sol., 'Do not think that I am black/brown, because [the] sun has discoloured me.' – Vg^{Colunga&Turrado}

Songs 1:13

בֵּ֥ין שָׁדַ֖י יָלִֽין׃, bên šā-ḏay yā-lîn., 'between [my] breasts [it] spends the night.' – WLC
ἀνὰ μέσον τῶν μαστῶν μου αὐλισθήσεται·, 'between my breasts [he] shall spend the night;' – LXX^{Rahlfs} Brenton ABP
inter ubera mea commorabitur, 'between my breasts [it] will stay' – Vg^{Colunga&Turrado}
omitted – LXX^{Swete}

Songs 1:14

אֶשְׁכֹּ֨ל הַכֹּ֤פֶר ׀ דֹּודִי֙ לִ֔י, 'eš-kōl hak-kō-p̄er dō-w-ḏî lî,, 'A cluster of henna [blooms is] my beloved to me' – WLC
βότρυς τῆς κύπρου ἀδελφιδός μου ἐμοὶ, 'A cluster of henna is my beloved [man]' – LXX^{Rahlfs} Brenton ABP. κύπρος is a Semitic loanword identical with Hebrew כֹּפֶר / כּוֺפֶר kōp̱er, meaning "henna". When capitalised, this word is identical to the Greek name of Cyprus, which may or may not have been derived from this word.
Botrus cypri dilectus meus, 'My beloved cluster of henna' – Vg^{Colunga&Turrado}. cyprus, not to be confused with the island of Cyprus, is the latinisation of κύπρος, and the origin of the English word cypress.
omitted – LXX^{Swete}

Songs 1:16

אַף־ עַרְשֵׂ֖נוּ רַעֲנָנָֽה׃, 'ap̄- 'ar-śê-nū ra-'ă-nā-nāh., 'Also, our bed is green. or Indeed, our couch is luxuriant!' – WLC
πρὸς κλίνη(ν) ἡμῶν σύσκιος,, 'to our shady bed. or overshadowing our bed.' – LXX^{Swete} LXX^{Rahlfs} Brenton ABP
Lectulus noster floridus., 'Our couch / little bed [is] flowery.' – Vg^{Colunga&Turrado}

Songs 1:17

רחיטנו, ra-ḥî-ṭê-nū, '[And] our rafters' – K
רַהִיטֵ֖נוּ, ra-khî-ṭê-nū, '[And] our rafters' – Q

==== Song of Songs 2 ====
Songs 2:3

לְחִכִּֽי׃, lə-ḥik-kî., 'to (the roof of) my mouth / palate or to my taste' – WLC
ἐν λάρυγγί μου., 'in my throat/gullet.' – LXX^{Swete} LXX^{Rahlfs} Brenton ABP. λάρυγξ is the origin of the modern English word larynx.
gutturi meo., 'in my throat.' – Vg^{Colunga&Turrado}. guttur is the origin of the modern English word goitre.

Songs 2:6

περιλήψεται, 'will embrace' – ABP Brenton (classical Greek spelling)
περιλήμψεται, 'will embrace' – LXX^{Swete} LXX^{Rahlfs} (Koine Greek spelling)

Compare Deuteronomy 22:30

Songs 2:7

ἐν δυνάμεσι(ν), 'by powers' – LXX^{Swete} Brenton
εν ταις δυνάμεσι(ν), 'by the powers' – LXX^{Rahlfs} ABP

Songs 2:8

זֶ֖ה, zeh, 'this [one]' – WLC
οὗτος, 'this [one]' – LXX^{Swete} LXX^{Rahlfs} Brenton
ούτως, 'thus / in this way' – ABP
iste, 'that [one]' – Vg^{Colunga&Turrado}

Songs 2:9

ἐπὶ τὰ ὄρη Βαιθήλ., 'on the mountains of Baithel' – LXX^{Swete} LXX^{Rahlfs} Brenton
omitted – WLC ABP Vg^{Colunga&Turrado}

Compare Songs 2:17.

Songs 2:17

עַל־הָ֥רֵי בָֽתֶר׃ ס, 'al- hā-rê ḇā-ṯer. s, 'upon the mountains of Bether.' – WLC
ἐπὶ ὄρη κοιλωμάτων., 'encircling upon the mountains.' – LXX^{Swete} LXX^{Rahlfs} Brenton ABP
super montes Bether., 'on/above the mountains [of] Bether.' – Vg^{Colunga&Turrado}

Compare Songs 2:9.

==== Song of Songs 3 ====
Songs 3:3

רְאִיתֶֽם׃, rə-'î-ṯem., 'Have you seen....?' – WLC
εἴδετε;, 'Have you known....?' – LXX^{Swete} LXX^{Rahlfs}. From the verb οἶδα ("to know").
ίδετε;, 'Do you see....?' – Brenton ABP. From the verb εἶδον ("to see").
vidistis?, 'Have you seen....?' – Vg^{Colunga&Turrado}. The Latin verb vidēo ("I see") is the origin of the modern English word video.

Songs 3:7

τοῦ Σαλωμών,, 'of Salomon,' – LXX^{Swete} LXX^{Rahlfs} Brenton
του Σολομώντος, 'of Solomon' – ABP

Songs 3:8

חֶ֔רֶב, ḥe-reḇ, 'swords' – WLC
ρομφαίαν, 'a rhomphaia / a (Greek single-edged) broadsword' – LXX^{Swete} LXX^{Rahlfs} Brenton ABP
gladios, 'gladii / (Roman double-edged) swords' – Vg^{Colunga&Turrado}

Compare Judges 19:29.

Songs 3:9

שְׁלֹמֹ֔ה, šə-lō-mōh, 'Shalomo' – WLC
Σαλωμών, 'Salomon' – LXX^{Swete} LXX^{Rahlfs} Brenton
Σολομών, 'Solomon' – ABP
Salomon, 'Salomon' – Vg^{Colunga&Turrado}

Songs 3:10

ἀργύριον, 'silver' – LXX^{Swete} LXX^{Rahlfs} Brenton
αργυρίου, 'of silver or silvery / a piece of silver' – ABP

Songs 3:11

צְאֶ֧ינָה ׀ וּֽרְאֶ֛ינָה בְּנֹ֥ות צִיֹּ֖ון, ṣə-'e-nāh ū-rə-'e-nāh bə-nō-wṯ ṣî-yō-wn, 'Go forth and see daughters of Zion' – WLC
ἐξέλθατε καὶ ἴδετε, 'come forth and behold' – LXX^{Swete} LXX^{Rahlfs}
Θυγατέρες Σιών εξέλθετε, και ίδετε, 'O daughters of Sion come forth, and behold' – Brenton
εξέλθετε και ίδετε θυγατέρες Σιών, 'Come forth and behold, o daughters of Sion' – ABP
Egredimini et videte, filiae Sion,, 'Go out and see, (o) daughters of Sion,' – Vg^{Colunga&Turrado}

=== Book of Isaiah ===
Isaiah 7:14

עַלְמָה, hā-'al-māh,, 'young woman' – WLC 1QIsa^{a}
עוּלֶמְתָּא, hā-'al-māh tā,, 'young woman' – Targ^{Jon}
παρθένος, 'virgin' – LXX LXX^{Swete} ABP Brenton
virgo, 'virgin' – Vg^{Clement} Vg^{Colunga&Turrado}

Isaiah 29:13

וַתְּהִ֤י יִרְאָתָם֙ אֹתִ֔י מִצְוַ֥ת אֲנָשִׁ֖ים מְלֻמָּדָֽה׃, wat-tə-hî yir-'ā-ṯām 'ō-ṯî, miṣ-waṯ 'ă-nā-šîm mə-lum-mā-ḏāh., 'and their fear towards me is taught by the commandment of men.' – MT
μάτην δὲ σέβονταί με διδάσκοντες ἐντάλματα ἀνθρώπων καὶ διδασκαλίας., 'and in vain they worship me, teaching [the] precepts and instructions of men.' – LXX^{Swete}, ABP

Compare New Testament quotation:
μάτην δὲ σέβονταί με, διδάσκοντες διδασκαλίας ἐντάλματα ἀνθρώπων·, 'In vain they now worship me, teaching [as] doctrines [the] precepts of men.' – Mark 7:7

Isaiah 40:3

מְסִלָּ֖ה לֵאלֹהֵֽינוּ׃, mə-sil-lāh lê-lō-hê-nū., 'a highway for our god.' – MT
τὰς τρίβους τοῦ θεοῦ ἡμῶν., 'the roads of our God.' – LXX^{Swete}, ABP
semitas Dei nostri., '[the] paths of our God.' – Vg^{Clement} Vg^{Colunga&Turrado}

Compare New Testament quotations:
τὰς τρίβους αὐτοῦ·, 'the roads of him.' – Mark 1:3, Matthew 3:3 Luke 3:4
τὴν ὁδὸν Κυρίου, 'the way of [the] Lord' – John 1:23

Isaiah 42:19

עַבְדִּ֔י, 'aḇ·dî, 'my servant' – MT
παίδες μου, 'my servants' – ABP

Isaiah 53:10

יִרְאֶ֥ה זֶ֖רַע יַאֲרִ֣יךְ יָמִ֑ים, yir-'eh ze-ra' ya-'ă-rîḵ yā-mîm;, 'he shall see [his] seed/offspring, he shall prolong [his] days;' – MT
ὄψεται σπέρμα μακρόβιον·, opsetai sperma makrobion., '[he] shall see a long-lived seed.' – LXX^{Swete}, ABP Brenton
videbit semen longævum,, '[he] will see long-lived seed,' – Vg^{Clement} Vg^{Colunga&Turrado}

Isaiah 53:11

יִרְאֶ֣ה, yir-'eh, 'he shall see' – MT
יראה אור, yir-'eh 'ór, 'he shall see [the] light' – 4QIsa^{d}
δείξαι αυτῴ φῶς, 'to show to him light' – LXX, LXX^{Swete}, ABP Brenton
videbit, '[he] will see' – Vg^{Clement} Vg^{Colunga&Turrado}

== See also ==
- List of Hebrew Bible manuscripts
- Textual variants in the New Testament
- Textual variants in the Primary Chronicle

== Bibliography ==
- Biblia: quid in hac editione praestitum sit. Translated by Estienne, Robert. 1545.
- Biblos.com & Helps Ministries (2011–2018). "Interlinear Bible (Westminster Leningrad Codex – English)". Biblehub.com.
- Brenton, Lancelot Charles Lee (1851). "Brenton's Septuagint Translation". Biblehub.com.
- Brenton, Lancelot Charles Lee (1879). The Septuagint version of the OT, with an English translation (PDF). London: Samuel Bagster. p. 1156.
- Brooke, Alan England; McLean, Norman; Thackeray, Henry St. John (1909). The Old Testament in Greek. Volume I: The Octateuch. Part II: Exodus and Leviticus. Cambridge: Cambridge University Press. p. 268.
- Everson, David L. (2014). "The Vetus Latina and the Vulgate of the Book of Exodus". The Book of Exodus: Composition, Reception, and Interpretation. Leiden: Brill. pp. 370–386. ISBN 978-90-04-28266-7.
- Rahlfs, Alfred (1935). "Η Παλαιά Διαθήκη (The Old Testament Rahlfs)". Alfred Rahlfs' edition of the Septuagint (in Greek). Greek Wikisource.
- Robert, Ulysse (1881). Pentateuchi versio latina antiquissima e Codice Lugdunensi. Paris: Firmin-Didot. p. 330.
- Scholz, Susanne (2021). Sacred Witness. Rape in the Hebrew Bible. Fortress Press. ISBN 978-1-5064-8203-3. (E-book edition)
- Swete, Henry Barclay (1930). "Swete's Septuagint". Biblehub.com.
- Emanuel Tov, The Text-Critical Use of the Septuagint in Biblical Research (TCU), 1981 (1st edition), 1997 (2nd edition), 2015 (3rd edition).
- Emanuel Tov, Textual Criticism of the Hebrew Bible (TCHB), 1992 (1st edition), 2001 (2nd edition), 2012 (3rd edition), 2022 (4th edition).
- Emanuel Tov, Textual Criticism of the Hebrew Bible, Qumran, Septuagint: Collected Writings, Volume 3 (2015).
- Tov, Emanuel (1999). "38. The Septuagint Additions ('Miscellanies') in 1 Kings 2 (3 Reigns 2)". The Greek and Hebrew Bible: Collected Essays on the Septuagint. Vetus Testamentum Supplements. Vol. 72. Leiden: Brill. doi:10.1163/9789004275973_039. ISBN 978-90-04-27597-3.
- Trible, Phyllis (1984). Texts of Terror: Literary-feminist Readings of Biblical Narratives. Philadelphia: Fortress Press. ISBN 0-8006-1537-9.
- van de Giessen, J. P. (2003). "Index Bijbelverzen". bijbelaantekeningen.nl (in Dutch).
- Van der Pool, Charles (1996). "Apostolic Bible Polyglot (ABP)". Biblehub.com.
- Wells, Bruce (2020). "On the Beds of a Woman: The Leviticus Texts on Same-Sex Relations Reconsidered". Sexuality and Law in the Torah. Bloomsbury Publishing. pp. 123–158. ISBN 978-0-567-68160-7.
