= 613 commandments =

Traditional count of Torah commands

According to Jewish tradition, the Torah contains 613 commandments (Hebrew: תרי״ג מצוות, romanized: taryág mitsvót). This claim is first recorded in the 3rd century CE, when Rabbi Simlai mentioned it in a sermon that is recorded in Talmud Makkot 23b. Other classical sages who hold this view include Rabbi Simeon ben Azzai and Rabbi Eleazar ben Yose the Galilean. It is quoted in Midrash Exodus Rabbah 33:7, Numbers Rabbah 13:15–16; 18:21 and Talmud Yevamot 47b. The 613 commandments include "positive commandments", to perform an act (mitzvot aseh), and "negative commandments", to abstain from an act (mitzvot lo taaseh). The negative commandments number 365, which coincides with the number of days in the solar year, and the positive commandments number 248, a number ascribed to the number of bones and main organs in the human body.

Although the number 613 is mentioned in the Talmud, its real significance increased in later medieval rabbinic literature, including many works listing or arranged by the mitzvot. The most famous of these was an enumeration of the 613 commandments by Maimonides. While the total number of commandments is 613, no individual can perform all of them. Many can only be observed at the Temple in Jerusalem, which no longer stands. According to one standard reckoning, there are 77 positive and 194 negative commandments that can be observed today, of which there are 26 commandments that apply only within the Land of Israel. In addition, some commandments only apply to certain categories of Jews: some are only observed by kohanim, and others only by men or by women.

== Symbolism of 613 ==
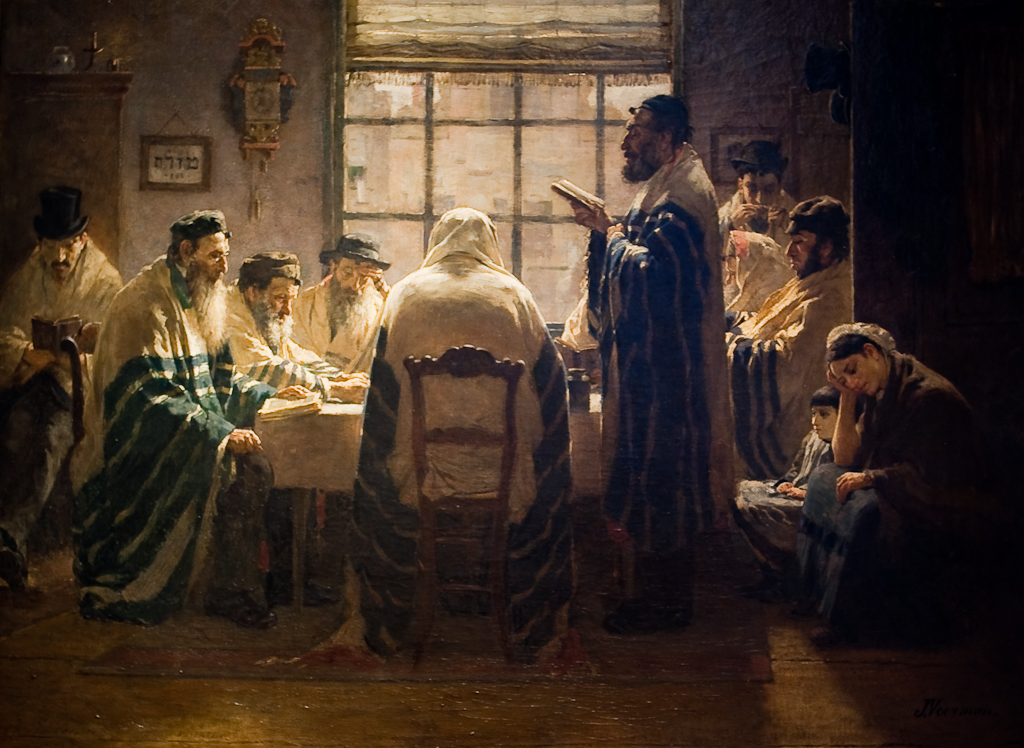
De Rouwdagen (The mourning days) by Jan Voerman, c. 1884

Rav Hamnuna sourced the count of 613 in the verse Deuteronomy 33:4 ("Moses commanded us the Torah..."). The Talmud notes that the Hebrew numerical value (gematria) of the word Torah is 611 (ת = 400, ו = 6, ר = 200, ה = 5). Combining 611 commandments which Moses taught the people, with the first two of the Ten Commandments which were the only ones directly heard from God, a total of 613 is reached.

Other sources connect the tzitzit (ritual fringes of a garment) to the 613 commandments by gematria: the word tzitzit (Hebrew: ציצית, in its Mishnaic spelling) has the value 600 (צ = 90, י = 10, ת = 400). Each tassel has eight threads (when doubled over) and five sets of knots. The sum of all these numbers is 613, reflecting the concept that tzitzit reminds its wearer of all Torah commandments.

Many Jewish philosophical and mystical works (e.g., by Baal HaTurim, the Maharal of Prague and leaders of Hasidic Judaism) find allusions and inspirational calculations relating to the number of commandments.

== Dissent and difficulties ==
Rabbinic support for the number of commandments being 613 is not without dissent. For example, Ben Azzai held that there exist 300 positive mitzvot. Also, even as the number gained acceptance, difficulties arose in elucidating the list. Some rabbis declared that this count was not an authentic tradition, or that it was not logically possible to come up with a systematic count. No early work of Jewish law or Biblical commentary depended on the 613 system, and no early systems of Jewish principles of faith made acceptance of this Aggadah (non-legal Talmudic statement) normative. A number of classical authorities denied that it was normative:

- Rabbi Abraham ibn Ezra denied that this was an authentic rabbinic tradition. Ibn Ezra writes "Some sages enumerate 613 mitzvot in many diverse ways [...] but in truth there is no end to the number of mitzvot [...] and if we were to count only the root principles [...] the number of mitzvot would not reach 613".
- Nahmanides held that this particular counting was a matter of rabbinic controversy, and that rabbinic opinion on this is not unanimous. Nonetheless, he concedes that "this total has proliferated throughout the aggadic literature... we ought to say that it was a tradition from Moses at Mount Sinai".
- Rabbi Simeon ben Zemah Duran likewise rejected the dogma of the 613 as being the sum of the Law, saying that "perhaps the agreement that the number of mitzvot is 613... is just Rabbi Simlai's opinion, following his own explication of the mitzvot. And we need not rely on his explication when we come to determine [and affect] the Law, but rather on the Talmudic discussions".
- Gersonides held that the number 613 was only one rabbi's (Rabbi Simlai's) opinion, and if the conclusion of a Talmudic discussion indicated that the number of commandments was greater or lesser than 613, Rabbi Simlai's opinion would be overruled. He argued that the number 613 was only intended as an approximation, and that the comparison to 248 limbs and 365 days was intended homiletically, to motivate Jews to keep the commandments.
- The Vilna Gaon suggested that there exist many more than 613 commandments (because otherwise large narrative parts of the Pentateuch would be without commandments, which he considered difficult to accept) and that the count of 613 refers to "roots" (shorashim) of the other commandments.

Even when rabbis attempted to compile a list of the 613 commandments, they were faced with a number of difficulties:

- Which statements were to be included amongst the 613 commandments? Every one of God's commands to any individual or to the entire people of Israel?
- Would an order from God be counted as a commandment, for the purposes of such a list, if it could only be complied with in one place and time? Else, would such an order only count as a commandment if it could be followed at all times? (The latter is the view of Maimonides.)
- Does counting a single commandment depend on whether it falls within one verse, even though it may contain multiple prohibitions, or should each prohibition count as a single commandment?

Ultimately, though, the concept of 613 commandments has become accepted as normative amongst practicing Jews and today it is still common practice to refer to the total system of commandments within the Torah as the "613 commandments", even among those who do not literally accept this count as accurate.

However, the 613 mitzvot do not constitute a formal code of present-day halakha. Later codes of law such as the Shulkhan Arukh and the Kitzur Shulkhan Arukh do not refer to it. However, Maimonides' Mishneh Torah is prefaced by a count of the 613 mitzvot.

== Works which enumerate the commandments ==
There is no single definitive list that explicates the 613 commandments. Lists differ, for example, in how they interpret passages in the Torah that may be read as dealing with several cases under a single law or several separate laws (see here for a visual comparison of several lists). Other "commandments" in the Torah are restricted as one-time acts, and would not be considered as "mitzvot" binding on other persons. In rabbinic literature, Rishonim and later scholars composed to articulate and justify their enumeration of the commandments:

- Halachot Gedolot ("Great Laws"), thought to be written by Rabbi Simeon Kayyara (the Bahag, author of the Halakhot Gedolot) is the earliest extant enumeration of the 613 mitzvot.
- Sefer ha-Mitzvoth ("Book of Commandments") by Rabbi Saadia Gaon. Written during the period of the Geonim, Saadia's work is a simple list (though it was later expanded by Rabbi Yerucham Fishel Perlow.)
- Sefer Hamitzvot ("Book of Commandments") by Maimonides, with a commentary by Nachmanides. Maimonides employs a set of fourteen rules (shorashim) which determine inclusion into the list. In this work, he supports his specification of each mitzvah through quotations from the midrash halakha and the Gemara. Nachmanides makes a number of critical points and replaces some items of the list with others.
- Sefer ha-Chinnuch ("Book of Education"). This work generally follows Maimonides' reckoning of the 613 commandments. It is written in the order in which the commandments appear in the Torah rather than an arrangement by category (as in Maimonides' work.) In addition to enumerating the commandments and giving a brief overview of relevant laws, the Sefer ha-Chinuch also tries to explain the philosophical reasons behind the mitzvot. It has been attributed to various authors, most commonly Rabbi Aaron ha-Levi of Barcelona (the Ra'ah), though its true authorship is unknown.
- Sefer Mitzvot Gadol or SMaG ("Large book of Commandments") by Rabbi Moses ben Jacob of Coucy.
- Sefer ha-Mitzvoth by Rabbi Yisrael Meir Kagan (the "Chafetz Chaim"). The Chafetz Chaim's work follows the reckoning of Maimonides but gives only the commandments relevant today. Notably, this listing omits commandments regarding temple service, ritual purity, sacrifices, and so on. Though the original work included only those commandments relevant in all places and at all times, later editions include agricultural laws relevant today only in the Land of Israel.

=== Works in which the number of commandments is not 613 ===
- Sefer Yereim by Eliezer ben Samuel lists only 417 commandments (including commandments only applicable when the Temple stood).
- Menahem Recanati, in his book Taamei haMitzvot, counted 250 positive and 361 negative commandments, for a total of 611. These 611 include the two commandments of Exodus 20:2, indicating that this list is incompatible with the approach of R' Hamnuna in the Talmud (who said that of the 613 commandments, the two in Exodus 20:2 were given directly by God, and the remaining 611 via Moses).
- Sefer Mitzvoth Katan, by Rabbi Isaac of Corbeil, listed 320 commandments applicable nowadays. To reach a total of 613, one would have to add 293 commandments applicable only while the Temple stood. As the number of Temple-only commandments appears to be much lower than 293 (for example, Sefer haHinuch only counted 201 such commandments), it seems that the overall count of commandments would likely be lower than 613.
- According to Asael Ben-Or, Gersonides' commentary to the Torah indicates that he counted a total of 513 commandments.

== Maimonides' list ==
The following are the 613 commandments and the source of their derivation from the Hebrew Bible as enumerated by Maimonides:

=== Canonical order ===
Maimonides' list sorted by occurrence in the Torah
1. Gen. 1:28 — To have children with one's wife
2. Gen. 32:33 — Not to eat the sinew of the thigh
3. Ex. 12:2 — Courts must calculate to determine when a new month begins
4. Ex. 12:6 — To slaughter the paschal sacrifice at the specified time
5. Ex. 12:8 — To eat the Paschal Lamb with matzah and Marror on the night of the fifteenth of Nisan
6. Ex. 12:9 — Not to eat the paschal meat raw or boiled
7. Ex. 12:10 — Not to leave any meat from the paschal offering over until morning
8. Ex. 12:15 — To destroy all chametz on the 14th day of Nisan
9. Ex. 12:18 — To eat matzah on the first night of Passover
10. Ex. 12:19 — Not to find chametz in your domain on Passover
11. Ex. 12:20 — Not to eat mixtures containing chametz all seven days of Passover
12. Ex. 12:43 — An apostate must not eat from it
13. Ex. 12:45 — A permanent or temporary hired worker must not eat from it
14. Ex. 12:46 — Not to take the paschal meat from the confines of the group
15. Ex. 12:46 — Not to break any bones from the paschal offering → Ps. 34:20
16. Ex. 12:48 — An uncircumcised Kohen (priest) must not eat Terumah (heave offering)
17. Ex. 12:48 — An uncircumcised male must not eat from it
18. Ex. 13:3 — Not to eat chametz all seven days of Passover
19. Ex. 13:7 — Not to see chametz in your domain seven days
20. Ex. 13:8 — To relate the Exodus from Egypt on that night
21. Ex. 13:12 — To set aside the firstborn animals
22. Ex. 13:13 — To redeem the firstborn donkey by giving a lamb to a Kohen
23. Ex. 13:13 — To break the neck of the donkey if the owner does not intend to redeem it
24. Ex. 16:29 — Not to walk outside the city boundary on Shabbat
25. Ex. 20:2 — To know there is a God
26. Ex. 20:3 — Not to even think that there are other gods besides Him — Yemenite→Ex. 20:2
27. Ex. 20:5 — Not to make a graven image or any image for yourself — Yemenite→Ex. 20:4
28. Ex. 20:6 — Not to worship idols in the manner they are worshipped — Yemenite→Ex. 20:5
29. Ex. 20:6 — Not to worship idols in the four ways we worship God — Yemenite→Ex. 20:5
30. Ex. 20:7 — Not to take God's name in vain — Yemenite→Ex. 20:6
31. Ex. 20:9 — To sanctify the day with Kiddush and Havdalah — Yemenite→Ex. 20:8
32. Ex. 20:11 — Not to do prohibited labor on the seventh day — Yemenite→Ex. 20:10
33. Ex. 20:13 — Not to murder — Yemenite→Ex. 20:12
34. Ex. 20:13 — To respect one's father or mother — Yemenite→Ex. 20:12
35. Ex. 20:14 — Not to kidnap — Yemenite→Ex. 20:13
36. Ex. 20:14 — Not to testify falsely — Yemenite→Ex. 20:13
37. Ex. 20:15 — Not to covet and scheme to acquire another's possession — Yemenite→Ex. 20:14
38. Ex. 20:21 — Not to make human forms even for decorative purposes — Yemenite→Ex. 20:20
39. Ex. 20:24 — Not to build the altar with stones hewn by metal — Yemenite→Ex. 20:23
40. Ex. 20:27 — Not to climb steps to the altar — Yemenite→Ex. 20:26
41. Ex. 21:2 — Purchase a Hebrew slave in accordance with the prescribed laws
42. Ex. 21:8 — Redeem Jewish maidservants
43. Ex. 21:8 — Betroth the Jewish maidservant
44. Ex. 21:8 — The master must not sell his maidservant
45. Ex. 21:10 — Not to withhold food, clothing, and sexual relations from one's wife
46. Ex. 21:15 — Not to strike one's father and mother
47. Ex. 21:17 — Not to curse one's father and mother
48. Ex. 21:18 — The court must implement laws against the one who assaults another or damages another's property
49. Ex. 21:20 — The courts must carry out the death penalty of the sword
50. Ex. 21:28 — Not to benefit from an ox condemned to be stoned
51. Ex. 21:28 — The court must judge the damages incurred by a goring ox
52. Ex. 21:33 — The court must judge the damages incurred by a pit
53. Ex. 21:37 — The court must implement punitive measures against the thief
54. Ex. 22:4 — The court must judge the damages incurred by an animal eating
55. Ex. 22:5 — The court must judge the damages incurred by fire
56. Ex. 22:6 — The courts must carry out the laws of an unpaid guard
57. Ex. 22:8 — The courts must carry out the laws of the plaintiff, admitter, or denier
58. Ex. 22:9 — The courts must carry out the laws of a hired worker and hired guard
59. Ex. 22:13 — The courts must carry out the laws of a borrower
60. Ex. 22:15–16 — The court must fine one who sexually seduces a maiden
61. Ex. 22:17 — The court must not let the sorcerer live
62. Ex. 22:20 — Not to cheat a convert monetarily
63. Ex. 22:20 — Not to insult or harm a convert with words
64. Ex. 22:21 — Not to oppress the weak
65. Ex. 22:24 — Lend to the poor and destitute
66. Ex. 22:24 — Not to press them for payment if one knows they do not have it
67. Ex. 22:24 — Not to intermediate in an interest loan, guarantee, witness, or write the promissory note
68. Ex. 22:27 — Not to blaspheme
69. Ex. 22:27 — Not to curse judges
70. Ex. 22:27 — Not to curse the head of state or leader of the Sanhedrin
71. Ex. 22:28 — Not to preface one tithe to the next, but separate them in their proper order
72. Ex. 22:30 — Not to eat meat of an animal that was mortally wounded
73. Ex. 23:1 — Judges must not accept testimony unless both parties are present
74. Ex. 23:1 — Transgressors must not testify
75. Ex. 23:2 — Decide by majority in case of disagreement
76. Ex. 23:2 — The court must not execute through a majority of one; at least a majority of two is required
77. Ex. 23:2 — A judge who presented an acquittal plea must not present an argument for conviction in capital cases
78. Ex. 23:5 — Help another remove the load from a beast which can no longer carry it
79. Ex. 23:6 — A judge must not decide unjustly the case of the habitual transgressor
80. Ex. 23:7 — The court must not kill anybody on circumstantial evidence
81. Ex. 23:8 — Judges must not accept bribes
82. Ex. 23:11 — To leave free all produce which grew in that year
83. Ex. 23:12 — To rest on the seventh day
84. Ex. 23:13 — Not to swear in the name of an idol → Deut. 13:14
85. Ex. 23:14 — To celebrate on these three Festivals (bring a peace offering)
86. Ex. 23:18 — Not to slaughter it while in possession of leaven
87. Ex. 23:18 — Not to leave the fat overnight
88. Ex. 23:19 — Not to eat mixtures of milk and meat cooked together
89. Ex. 23:19 —To set aside the first fruits and bring them to the Temple
90. Ex. 23:25 — To serve the Almighty with prayer
91. Ex. 23:33 — Not to let the Canaanites dwell in the Land of Israel
92. Ex. 25:8 — To build a Temple
93. Ex. 25:15 — Not to remove the staves from the ark
94. Ex. 25:30 — To make the show bread
95. Ex. 27:21 — To light the Menorah every day
96. Ex. 28:2 — The Kohanim must wear their priestly garments during service
97. Ex. 28:28 — The Kohen Gadol's (High Priest) breastplate must not be loosened from the Efod
98. Ex. 28:32 — Not to tear the priestly garments
99. Ex. 29:33 — The Kohanim must eat the sacrificial meat in the Temple
100. Ex. 29:33 — A non-Kohen must not eat sacrificial meat
101. Ex. 30:7 — To burn incense every day
102. Ex. 30:9 — Not to burn anything on the Golden Altar besides incense
103. Ex. 30:13 — Each man must give a half shekel annually
104. Ex. 30:19 — A Kohen must wash his hands and feet before service
105. Ex. 30:31 — To prepare the anointing oil
106. Ex. 30:32 — Not to reproduce the anointing oil
107. Ex. 30:32 — Not to anoint with anointing oil
108. Ex. 30:37 — Not to reproduce the incense formula
109. Ex. 34:21 — To rest the land during the seventh year by not doing any work which enhances growth
110. Ex. 34:26 — Not to cook meat and milk together
111. Ex. 35:3 — The court must not inflict punishment on Shabbat
112. Lev. 1:3 — Carry out the procedure of the burnt offering as prescribed in the Torah
113. Lev. 2:1 — To bring meal offerings as prescribed in the Torah
114. Lev. 2:11 — Not to burn honey or yeast on the altar
115. Lev. 2:13 — To salt all sacrifices
116. Lev. 2:13 — Not to omit the salt from sacrifices
117. Lev. 3:11 — Not to put frankincense on the meal offerings of wrongdoers
118. Lev. 3:17 — Not to eat blood
119. Lev. 3:17 — Not to eat certain fats of clean animals
120. Lev. 4:13 — The Sanhedrin must bring an offering (in the Temple) when it rules in error
121. Lev. 4:27 — Every person must bring a sin offering (in the Temple) for his transgression
122. Lev. 5:1 — Anybody who knows evidence must testify in court
123. Lev. 5:7–11 — Bring an oleh v'yored (Temple offering) offering (if the person is wealthy, an animal; if poor, a bird or meal offering)
124. Lev. 5:8 — Not to decapitate a fowl brought as a sin offering
125. Lev. 5:11 — Not to put oil on the meal offerings of wrongdoers
126. Lev. 5:16 — One who profaned property must repay what he profaned plus a fifth and bring a sacrifice
127. Lev. 5:17–18 — Bring an asham talui (temple offering) when uncertain of guilt
128. Lev. 5:23 — Return the robbed object or its value
129. Lev. 5:25 — Bring an asham vadai (temple offering) when guilt is ascertained
130. Lev. 6:3 — To remove the ashes from the altar every day
131. Lev. 6:6 — To light a fire on the altar every day
132. Lev. 6:6 — Not to extinguish this fire
133. Lev. 6:9 — The Kohanim must eat the remains of the meal offerings
134. Lev. 6:10 — Not to bake a meal offering as leavened bread
135. Lev. 6:13 — The Kohen Gadol must bring a meal offering every day
136. Lev. 6:16 — Not to eat the meal offering of the High Priest
137. Lev. 6:18 — Carry out the procedure of the sin offering
138. Lev. 6:23 — Not to eat the meat of the inner sin offering
139. Lev. 7:1 — Carry out the procedure of the guilt offering
140. Lev. 7:11 — To follow the procedure of the peace offering
141. Lev. 7:17 — To burn the leftover sacrifices
142. Lev. 7:18 — Not to eat from sacrifices offered with improper intentions
143. Lev. 7:19 — Not to eat from sacrifices which became impure
144. Lev. 7:19 — To burn all impure sacrifices
145. Lev. 7:20 — An impure person must not eat from sacrifices
146. Lev. 10:6 — A Kohen must not enter the Temple with his head uncovered
147. Lev. 10:6 — A Kohen must not enter the Temple with torn clothes
148. Lev. 10:7 — A Kohen must not leave the Temple during service
149. Lev. 10:9 — A Kohen must not enter the Temple intoxicated
150. Lev. 10:19 — Mourn for relatives
151. Lev. 11:2 — To examine the signs of animals to distinguish between kosher and non-kosher
152. Lev. 11:4 — Not to eat non-kosher animals
153. Lev. 11:9 — To examine the signs of fish to distinguish between kosher and non-kosher
154. Lev. 11:11 — Not to eat non-kosher fish
155. Lev. 11:13 — Not to eat non-kosher fowl
156. Lev. 11:21 — To examine the signs of locusts to distinguish between kosher and non-kosher
157. Lev. 11:29 — Observe the laws of impurity caused by the eight shratzim (insects)
158. Lev. 11:34 — Observe the laws of impurity concerning liquid and solid foods
159. Lev. 11:39 — Observe the laws of impurity caused by a dead beast
160. Lev. 11:41 — Not to eat non-kosher creatures that crawl on land
161. Lev. 11:42 — Not to eat worms found in fruit
162. Lev. 11:43 — Not to eat creatures that live in water other than (kosher) fish
163. Lev. 11:44 — Not to eat non-kosher maggots
164. Lev. 12:2 — Observe the laws of impurity caused by childbirth
165. Lev. 12:3 — To circumcise all males on the eighth day after their birth
166. Lev. 12:6 — A woman who gave birth must bring an offering (in the Temple) after she goes to the Mikveh
167. Lev. 13:12 — Rule the laws of human tzara'at as prescribed in the Torah
168. Lev. 13:33 — The metzora (one having a skin disease) must not shave signs of impurity in his hair
169. Lev. 13:34 — Carry out the laws of tzara'at of houses
170. Lev. 13:45 — The metzora must publicize his condition by tearing his garments, allowing his hair to grow and covering his lips
171. Lev. 13:47 — Carry out the laws of tzara'at of clothing
172. Lev. 14:2 — Carry out the prescribed rules for purifying the metzora
173. Lev. 14:9 — The metzora must shave off all his hair prior to purification
174. Lev. 14:10 — A metzora must bring an offering (in the Temple) after going to the Mikveh
175. Lev. 15:3 — Observe the laws of impurity caused by a man's running issue (irregular ejaculation of infected semen)
176. Lev. 15:13–14 — A man who had a running (unnatural urinary) issue must bring an offering (in the Temple) after he goes to the Mikveh
177. Lev. 15:16 — Observe the laws of impurity of a seminal emission (regular ejaculation, with normal semen)
178. Lev. 15:16 — Every impure person must immerse himself in a Mikvah to become pure
179. Lev. 15:19 — Observe the laws of menstrual impurity
180. Lev. 15:25 — Observe the laws of impurity caused by a woman's running issue
181. Lev. 15:28–29 — A woman who had a running (vaginal) issue must bring an offering (in the Temple) after she goes to the Mikveh
182. Lev. 16:2 — A Kohen must not enter the Temple indiscriminately
183. Lev. 16:3 — To follow the procedure of Yom Kippur in the sequence prescribed in Parshah Acharei Mot ("After the death of Aaron's sons...")
184. Lev. 16:29 — To afflict yourself on Yom Kippur
185. Lev. 17:4 — Not to slaughter sacrifices outside the courtyard
186. Lev. 17:13 — To cover the blood (of a slaughtered beast or fowl) with earth
187. Lev. 18:6 — Not to make pleasurable (sexual) contact with any forbidden woman
188. Lev. 18:7 — Not to have sexual relations with one's mother
189. Lev. 18:7 — Not to have sexual relations with one's father
190. Lev. 18:8 — Not to have sexual relations with the wife of one's father
191. Lev. 18:9 — Not to have sexual relations with one's sister
192. Lev. 18:11— Not to have sexual relations with the daughter of the wife of one's father
193. Lev. 18:10 — Not to have sexual relations with the daughter of one's son
194. Lev. 18:10 — Not to have sexual relations with one's daughter
195. Lev. 18:10 — Not to have sexual relations with the daughter of one's daughter
196. Lev. 18:12 — Not to have sexual relations with the sister of one's father
197. Lev. 18:13 — Not to have sexual relations with the sister of one's mother
198. Lev. 18:14 — Not to have sexual relations with the wife of the brother of one's father
199. Lev. 18:14 — Not to have sexual relations with the brother of one's father
200. Lev. 18:15 — Not to have sexual relations with the wife of one's son
201. Lev. 18:16 — Not to have sexual relations with the wife of one's brother
202. Lev. 18:17 — Not to have sexual relations with a woman and her daughter
203. Lev. 18:17 — Not to have sexual relations with a woman and her son's daughter
204. Lev. 18:17 — Not to have sexual relations with a woman and her daughter's daughter
205. Lev. 18:18 — Not to have sexual relations with the sister of one's wife
206. Lev. 18:19 — Not to have sexual relations with a menstrually impure woman
207. Lev. 18:20 — Not to have sexual relations with someone else's wife
208. Lev. 18:22 — A man must not have sexual relations with a man
209. Lev. 18:23 — A man must not have sexual relations with an animal
210. Lev. 18:23 — A woman must not have sexual relations with an animal
211. Lev. 19:3 — Be in awe of one's mother or father
212. Lev. 19:4 — Not to inquire into idolatry
213. Lev. 19:4 — Not to make an idol for others
214. Lev. 19:8 — Not to eat from that which was left over
215. Lev. 19:9 — Not to reap a corner of the field
216. Lev. 19:9 — To leave gleanings
217. Lev. 19:9 — Not to gather the gleanings
218. Lev. 19:10 — To leave a corner of the field uncut for the poor
219. Lev. 19:10 — To leave the gleanings of a vineyard
220. Lev. 19:10 — Not to gather the gleanings of a vineyard
221. Lev. 19:10 — To leave the unformed clusters of grapes
222. Lev. 19:10 — Not to pick the unformed clusters of grapes
223. Lev. 19:11 — Not to deny possession of something entrusted to one
224. Lev. 19:11 — Not to swear in denial of a monetary claim
225. Lev. 19:11 — Not to steal money stealthily
226. Lev. 19:12 — Not to swear falsely in God's name
227. Lev. 19:13 — Not to rob openly
228. Lev. 19:13 — Not to withhold wages or fail to repay a debt
229. Lev. 19:13 — Not to delay payment of wages past the agreed time
230. Lev. 19:14 — Not to put a stumbling block before a blind man (or give harmful advice)
231. Lev. 19:14 — Not to curse any upstanding Jew
232. Lev. 19:15 — A judge must not have mercy on the poor man at the trial
233. Lev. 19:15 — A judge must not respect the great man at the trial
234. Lev. 19:15 — A judge must not pervert justice
235. Lev. 19:15 — Judge righteously
236. Lev. 19:16 — Not to gossip
237. Lev. 19:16 — Not to stand idly by if someone's life is in danger
238. Lev. 19:17 — Not to hate fellow Jews
239. Lev. 19:17 — To reprove a sinner
240. Lev. 19:17 — Not to embarrass others
241. Lev. 19:18 — To love other Jews
242. Lev. 19:18 — Not to take revenge
243. Lev. 19:18 — Not to bear a grudge
244. Lev. 19:19 — Not to plant diverse seeds together
245. Lev. 19:19 — Not to crossbreed animals
246. Lev. 18:21 — Not to pass your children through the fire to Molech
247. Lev. 19:23 — Not to eat fruit of a tree during its first three years
248. Lev. 19:24 — The fourth year crops must be totally for holy purposes like Ma'aser Sheni
249. Lev. 19:26 — Not to be superstitious
250. Lev. 19:26 — Not to engage in divination or soothsaying
251. Lev. 19:27 — Men must not shave the hair off the sides of their head
252. Lev. 19:27 — Men must not shave their beards with a razor
253. Lev. 19:28 — Not to tattoo the skin
254. Lev. 19:30 — To show reverence to the Temple
255. Lev. 19:31 — Not to perform ov (medium)
256. Lev. 19:31 — Not to perform yidoni ("magical seer")
257. Lev. 19:32 — To honor those who teach and know Torah
258. Lev. 19:35 — Not to commit injustice with scales and weights
259. Lev. 19:36 — Each individual must ensure that his scales and weights are accurate
260. Lev. 21:1 — A Kohen must not defile himself (by going to funerals or cemeteries) for anyone except relatives
261. Lev. 21:8 — To dedicate the Kohen for service
262. Lev. 20:10 — The courts must carry out the death penalty of strangulation
263. Lev. 20:14 — The courts must carry out the death penalty of burning
264. Lev. 20:23 — Not to imitate them in customs and clothing
265. Lev. 21:7 — A Kohen must not marry a divorcee
266. Lev. 21:7 — A Kohen must not marry a zonah (a woman who has had a forbidden sexual relationship)
267. Lev. 21:7 — A Kohen must not marry a chalalah ("a desecrated person") (party to or product of 169–172)
268. Lev. 21:11 — The High Priest must not defile himself for any relative
269. Lev. 21:11 — The High Priest must not enter under the same roof as a corpse
270. Lev. 21:13 — The High Priest must marry a virgin maiden
271. Lev. 21:14 — The High Priest must not marry a widow
272. Lev. 21:15 — The High Priest must not have sexual relations with a widow even outside of marriage
273. Lev. 21:17 — A Kohen with a physical blemish must not serve
274. Lev. 21:17 — A Kohen with a temporary blemish must not serve
275. Lev. 21:23 — A Kohen with a physical blemish must not enter the sanctuary or approach the altar
276. Lev. 22:2 — Impure Kohanim must not do service in the temple
277. Lev. 22:4 — An impure Kohen must not eat Terumah
278. Lev. 22:7 — An impure Kohen, following immersion, must wait until after sundown before returning to service
279. Lev. 22:10 — A non-Kohen must not eat Terumah
280. Lev. 22:10 — A hired worker or a Jewish bondsman of a Kohen must not eat Terumah
281. Lev. 22:12 — A chalalah (party to #s 169-172 above) must not eat Terumah
282. Lev. 22:15 — Not to eat untithed fruits
283. Lev. 22:20 — Not to dedicate a blemished animal for the altar
284. Lev. 22:21 — To offer only unblemished animals
285. Lev. 22:21 — Not to inflict wounds upon dedicated animals
286. Lev. 22:22 — Not to slaughter it
287. Lev. 22:22 — Not to burn its fat
288. Lev. 22:24 — Not to offer to God any castrated male animals
289. Lev. 22:24 — Not to sprinkle its blood
290. Lev. 22:25 — Not to sacrifice blemished animals even if offered by non-Jews
291. Lev. 22:27 — To offer only animals which are at least eight days old
292. Lev. 22:28 — Not to slaughter an animal and its offspring on the same day
293. Lev. 22:30 — Not to leave sacrifices past the time allowed for eating them
294. Lev. 22:32 — To sanctify his name
295. Lev. 22:32 — Not to profane his name
296. Lev. 23:7 — To rest on the first day of Passover
297. Lev. 23:8 — Not to do prohibited labor on the first day of Passover
298. Lev. 23:8 — To rest on the seventh day of Passover
299. Lev. 23:8 — Not to do prohibited labor on the seventh day of Passover
300. Lev. 23:10 — To offer the wave offering from the meal of the new wheat
301. Lev. 23:14 — Not to eat bread from new grain before the Omer
302. Lev. 23:14 — Not to eat parched grains from new grain before the Omer
303. Lev. 23:14 — Not to eat ripened grains from new grain before the Omer
304. Lev. 23:15 — Each man must count the Omer – seven weeks from the day the new wheat offering was brought
305. Lev. 23:17 — To bring two loaves to accompany the above sacrifice
306. Lev. 23:21 — To rest on Shavuot
307. Lev. 23:21 — Not to do prohibited labor on Shavuot
308. Lev. 23:24 — To rest on Rosh Hashanah
309. Lev. 23:25 — Not to do prohibited labor on Rosh Hashanah
310. Lev. 23:29 — Not to eat or drink on Yom Kippur
311. Lev. 23:32 — To rest from prohibited labor on Yom Kippur
312. Lev. 23:32 — Not to do prohibited labor on Yom Kippur
313. Lev. 23:35 — To rest on Sukkot
314. Lev. 23:35 — Not to do prohibited labor on Sukkot
315. Lev. 23:36 — To rest on Shemini Atzeret
316. Lev. 23:36 — Not to do prohibited labor on Shemini Atzeret
317. Lev. 23:40 — To take up a Lulav and Etrog all seven days
318. Lev. 23:42 — To dwell in a Sukkah for the seven days of Sukkot
319. Lev. 25:4 — Not to work the land during the seventh year
320. Lev. 25:4 — Not to work with trees to produce fruit during that year
321. Lev. 25:5 — Not to reap crops that grow wild that year in the normal manner
322. Lev. 25:5 — Not to gather grapes which grow wild that year in the normal way
323. Lev. 25:8 — The Sanhedrin must count seven groups of seven years
324. Lev. 25:9 — To blow the Shofar on the tenth of Tishrei to free the slaves
325. Lev. 25:10 — The Sanhedrin must sanctify the fiftieth year
326. Lev. 25:11 — Not to work the soil during the fiftieth year (Jubilee)
327. Lev. 25:11 — Not to reap in the normal manner that which grows wild in the fiftieth year
328. Lev. 25:11 — Not to pick grapes which grew wild in the normal manner in the fiftieth year
329. Lev. 25:14 — Conduct sales according to Torah law
330. Lev. 25:14 — Not to overcharge or underpay for an article
331. Lev. 25:17 — Not to insult or harm anybody with words
332. Lev. 25:23 — Not to sell the land in Israel indefinitely
333. Lev. 25:24 — Carry out the laws of sold family properties
334. Lev. 25:29 — Carry out the laws of houses in walled cities
335. Lev. 25:34 — Not to sell the fields but they shall remain the Levites' before and after the Jubilee year
336. Lev. 25:37 — Not to lend with interest
337. Lev. 25:39 — Not to have him do menial slave labor
338. Lev. 25:42 — Not to sell him as a slave is sold
339. Lev. 25:43 — Not to work him oppressively
340. Lev. 25:46 — Canaanite slaves must work forever unless injured in one of their limbs
341. Lev. 25:53 — Not to allow a non-Jew to work him oppressively
342. Lev. 26:1 — Not to bow down before a smooth stone
343. Lev. 27:2 — To estimate the value of people as determined by the Torah
344. Lev. 27:10 — Not to substitute another beast for one set apart for sacrifice
345. Lev. 27:10 — The new animal, in addition to the substituted one, retains consecration
346. Lev. 27:12–13 — To estimate the value of consecrated animals
347. Lev. 27:14 — To estimate the value of consecrated houses
348. Lev. 27:16 — To estimate the value of consecrated fields
349. Lev. 27:26 — Not to change consecrated animals from one type of offering to another
350. Lev. 27:28 — Carry out the laws of interdicting possessions (cherem)
351. Lev. 27:28 — Not to sell the cherem
352. Lev. 27:28 — Not to redeem the cherem
353. Lev. 27:32 — Separate the tithe from animals
354. Lev. 27:33 — Not to redeem the tithe
355. Num. 5:2 — To send the impure from the Temple
356. Num. 5:3 — Impure people must not enter the Temple
357. Num. 5:7 — To repent and confess wrongdoings
358. Num. 5:15 — Not to put oil on her meal offering (as usual)
359. Num. 5:15 — Not to put frankincense on her meal offering (as usual)
360. Num. 5:30 — To fulfill the laws of the Sotah
361. Num. 6:3 — He must not drink wine, wine mixtures, or wine vinegar
362. Num. 6:3 — He must not eat fresh grapes
363. Num. 6:3 — He must not eat raisins
364. Num. 6:4 — He must not eat grape seeds
365. Num. 6:4 — He must not eat grape skins
366. Num. 6:5 — The Nazir must let his hair grow
367. Num. 6:5 — He must not cut his hair
368. Num. 6:7 — He must not come into contact with the dead
369. Num. 6:6 — He must not be under the same roof as a corpse
370. Num. 6:9 — He must shave his head after bringing sacrifices upon completion of his Nazirite period
371. Num. 6:23 — The Kohanim must bless the Jewish nation daily
372. Num. 7:9 — The Levites must transport the ark on their shoulders
373. Num. 9:11 — To slaughter the second Paschal Lamb
374. Num. 9:11 — To eat the second Paschal Lamb on the night of the 15th of Iyar
375. Num. 9:12 — Not to break any bones from the second paschal offering
376. Num. 9:12 — Not to leave the second paschal meat over until morning
377. Num. 10:9 — To afflict oneself and cry out before God in times of calamity
378. Num. 15:20 — To set aside a portion of dough for a Kohen
379. Num. 15:38 — To have tzitzit on four-cornered garments
380. Num. 15:39 — Not to follow the whims of your heart or what your eyes see
381. Num. 18:2 — To guard the Temple area
382. Num. 18:3 — No Levite must do another's work of either a Kohen or a Levite
383. Num. 18:4 — One who is not a Kohen must not serve
384. Num. 18:5 — Not to leave the Temple unguarded
385. Num. 18:15 — To redeem firstborn sons and give the money to a Kohen
386. Num. 18:17 — Not to redeem the firstborn
387. Num. 18:23 — The Levites must work in the Temple
388. Num. 18:24 — To set aside Ma'aser (tithe) each planting year and give it to a Levite
389. Num. 18:26 — The Levite must set aside a tenth of his tithe
390. Num. 19:2 — Carry out the procedure of the Red Heifer (Para Aduma)
391. Num. 19:14 — Carry out the laws of impurity of the dead
392. Num. 19:21 — Carry out the laws of the sprinkling water
393. Num. 27:8 — Carry out the laws of the order of inheritance
394. Num. 28:3 — To offer two lambs every day
395. Num. 28:9 — To bring two additional lambs as burnt offerings on Shabbat
396. Num. 28:11 — To bring additional offerings on Rosh Chodesh ("The New Month")
397. Num. 28:19 — To bring additional offerings on Passover
398. Num. 28:26 — To bring additional offerings on Shavuot
399. Num. 29:1 — To hear the Shofar on the first day of Tishrei (Rosh Hashanah)
400. Num. 29:2 — To bring additional offerings on Rosh Hashana
401. Num. 29:8 — To bring additional offerings on Yom Kippur
402. Num. 29:13 — To bring additional offerings on Sukkot
403. Num. 29:35 — To bring additional offerings on Shmini Atzeret
404. Num. 30:3 — Not to break oaths or vows
405. Num. 30:3 — For oaths and vows annulled, there are the laws of annulling vows explicit in the Torah
406. Num. 35:2 — To give the Levites cities to inhabit and their surrounding fields
407. Num. 35:12 — Not to kill the murderer before he stands trial
408. Num. 35:25 — The court must send the accidental murderer to a city of refuge
409. Num. 35:31 — Not to accept monetary restitution to atone for the murderer
410. Num. 35:32 — Not to accept monetary restitution instead of being sent to a city of refuge
411. Deut. 1:17 — Not to appoint judges who are not familiar with judicial procedure
412. Deut. 1:17 — The judge must not fear a violent man in judgment
413. Deut. 5:19 — Not to desire another's possession — Yemenite→Deut. 5:18
414. Deut. 6:4 — To know that he is One
415. Deut. 6:5 — To love Him
416. Deut. 6:7 — To learn Torah
417. Deut. 6:7 — To say the Shema twice daily
418. Deut. 6:8 — To wear tefillin (phylacteries) on the head
419. Deut. 6:8 — To bind tefillin on the arm
420. Deut. 6:9 — To put a mezuzah on each door post
421. Deut. 6:16 — Not to try the LORD unduly
422. Deut. 7:2 — Not to make a covenant with idolaters
423. Deut. 7:2 — Not to show favor to them
424. Deut. 7:3 — Not to marry non-Jews
425. Deut. 7:25 — Not to derive benefit from ornaments of idols
426. Deut. 7:26 — Not to derive benefit from idols and their accessories
427. Deut. 8:10 — To bless the Almighty after eating
428. Deut. 10:19 — To love converts
429. Deut. 10:20 — To fear Him
430. Deut. 10:20 — To cleave to Him
431. Deut. 10:20 — To swear in God's name to confirm the truth when deemed necessary by court
432. Deut. 12:2 — To destroy idols and their accessories
433. Deut. 12:4 — Not to destroy objects associated with His name
434. Deut. 12:5–6 — To bring all avowed and freewill offerings to the Temple on the first subsequent festival
435. Deut. 12:11 — To offer all sacrifices in the Temple
436. Deut. 12:13 — Not to offer any sacrifices outside the courtyard
437. Deut. 12:15 — To redeem dedicated animals which have become disqualified
438. Deut. 12:17 — Not to eat Ma'aser Sheni grains outside Jerusalem
439. Deut. 12:17 — Not to eat Ma'aser Sheni wine products outside Jerusalem
440. Deut. 12:17 — Not to eat Ma'aser Sheni oil outside Jerusalem
441. Deut. 12:17 — The Kohanim must not eat the first fruits outside Jerusalem
442. Deut. 12:17 — Not to eat its meat
443. Deut. 12:17 — The Kohanim must not eat the meat outside the Temple courtyard
444. Deut. 12:17 — Not to eat the meat of minor sacrifices before sprinkling the blood
445. Deut. 12:17 — The Kohanim must not eat unblemished firstborn animals outside Jerusalem
446. Deut. 12:19 — Not to refrain from rejoicing with, and giving gifts to, the Levites
447. Deut. 12:21 — To ritually slaughter an animal before eating it
448. Deut. 12:23 — Not to eat a limb torn off a living creature
449. Deut. 12:26 — To bring all sacrifices from outside Israel to the Temple
450. Deut. 13:1 — Not to add to the Torah commandments or their oral explanations
451. Deut. 13:1 — Not to diminish from the Torah any commandments, in whole or in part
452. Deut. 13:4 — Not to listen to a false prophet
453. Deut. 13:9 — Not to love the idolater
454. Deut. 13:9 — Not to cease hating the idolater
455. Deut. 13:9 — Not to save the idolater
456. Deut. 13:9 — Not to say anything in the idolater's defense
457. Deut. 13:9 — Not to refrain from incriminating the idolater
458. Deut. 13:12 — Not to missionize an individual to idol worship
459. Deut. 13:14 — Not to turn a city to idolatry → Ex. 23:13
460. Deut. 13:14 — Not to prophesy in the name of idolatry
461. Deut. 13:15 — Carefully interrogate the witness
462. Deut. 13:17 — To burn a city that has turned to idol worship
463. Deut. 13:17 — Not to rebuild it as a city
464. Deut. 13:18 — Not to derive benefit from it
465. Deut. 14:1 — Not to tear the skin in mourning
466. Deut. 14:1 — Not to make a bald spot in mourning
467. Deut. 14:3 — Not to eat sacrifices which have become unfit or blemished
468. Deut. 14:11 — To examine the signs of fowl to distinguish between kosher and non-kosher
469. Deut. 14:19 — Not to eat non-kosher flying insects
470. Deut. 14:21 — Not to eat the meat of an animal that died without ritual slaughter
471. Deut. 14:22 — To set aside the second tithe (Ma'aser Sheni)
472. Deut. 14:28 — To separate the "tithe for the poor"
473. Deut. 15:2 — To release all loans during the seventh year
474. Deut. 15:2 — Not to pressure or claim from the borrower
475. Deut. 15:3 — Press the idolater for payment
476. Deut. 15:7 — Not to withhold charity from the poor
477. Deut. 15:8 — To give charity
478. Deut. 15:9 — Not to refrain from lending immediately before the release of the loans for fear of monetary loss
479. Deut. 15:14 — Give him gifts when he goes free
480. Deut. 15:13 — Not to send him away empty-handed
481. Deut. 15:19 — Not to work consecrated animals
482. Deut. 15:19 — Not to shear the fleece of consecrated animals
483. Deut. 16:3 — Not to eat chametz on the afternoon of the 14th day of Nisan
484. Deut. 16:4 — Not to leave the meat of the holiday offering of the 14th until the 16th
485. Deut. 16:14 — To rejoice on these three Festivals (bring a peace offering)
486. Deut. 16:16 — To be seen at the Temple on Passover, Shavuot, and Sukkot
487. Deut. 16:16 — Not to appear at the Temple without offerings
488. Deut. 16:18 — Appoint judges
489. Deut. 16:21 — Not to plant a tree in the Temple courtyard
490. Deut. 16:22 — Not to erect a pillar in a public place of worship
491. Deut. 17:1 — Not to offer a temporarily blemished animal
492. Deut. 17:11 — Act according to the ruling of the Sanhedrin
493. Deut. 17:11 — Not to deviate from the word of the Sanhedrin
494. Deut. 17:15 — Appoint a king from Israel
495. Deut. 17:15 — Not to appoint a foreigner
496. Deut. 17:16 — The king must not have too many horses
497. Deut. 17:16 — Not to dwell permanently in Egypt
498. Deut. 17:17 — The king must not have too many wives
499. Deut. 17:17 — The king must not have too much silver and gold
500. Deut. 17:18 — The king must have a separate Sefer Torah for himself
501. Deut. 18:1 — The Tribe of Levi must not be given a portion of the land in Israel, rather they are given cities to dwell in
502. Deut. 18:1 — The Levites must not take a share in the spoils of war
503. Deut. 18:3 — To give the foreleg, two cheeks, and abomasum of slaughtered animals to a Kohen
504. Deut. 18:4 — To set aside Terumah Gedolah (gift for the Kohen)
505. Deut. 18:4 — To give the first shearing of sheep to a Kohen
506. Deut. 18:6–8 — The work of the Kohanim's shifts must be equal during holidays
507. Deut. 18:10 — Not to go into a trance to foresee events, etc.
508. Deut. 18:10 — Not to perform acts of magic
509. Deut. 18:11 — Not to mutter incantations
510. Deut. 18:11 — Not to attempt to contact the dead
511. Deut. 18:11 — Not to consult the ov
512. Deut. 18:11 — Not to consult the yidoni
513. Deut. 18:15 — To listen to the prophet speaking in His Name
514. Deut. 18:20 — Not to prophesy falsely in the name of God
515. Deut. 18:22 — Not to be afraid of the false prophet
516. Deut. 19:3 — Designate cities of refuge and prepare routes of access
517. Deut. 19:13 — A judge must not pity the murderer or assaulter at the trial
518. Deut. 19:14 — Not to move a boundary marker to steal someone's property
519. Deut. 19:15 — Not to accept testimony from a lone witness
520. Deut. 19:17 — A witness must not serve as a judge in capital crimes
521. Deut. 19:19 — Punish the false witnesses as they tried to punish the defendant
522. Deut. 20:2 — Appoint a priest to speak with the soldiers during the war
523. Deut. 20:3 — Not to panic and retreat during battle
524. Deut. 20:10 — Offer peace terms to the inhabitants of a city while holding siege, and treat them according to the Torah if they accept the terms
525. Deut. 20:16 — Not to let any of them remain alive
526. Deut. 20:17 — Destroy the seven Canaanite nations
527. Deut. 20:19 — Not to destroy food trees even during the siege
528. Deut. 21:4 — Break the neck of a calf by the river valley following an unsolved murder
529. Deut. 21:4 — Not to work nor plant that river valley
530. Deut. 21:11 — Keep the laws of the captive woman
531. Deut. 21:14 — Not to sell her into slavery
532. Deut. 21:14 — Not to retain her for servitude after having sexual relations with her
533. Deut. 21:18 — Not to be a rebellious son
534. Deut. 21:22 — The courts must hang those stoned for blasphemy or idolatry
535. Deut. 21:23 — Bury the executed on the day they are killed
536. Deut. 21:23 — Not to delay burial overnight
537. Deut. 22:1 — Return the lost object
538. Deut. 22:3 — Not to ignore a lost object
539. Deut. 22:4 — Help others load their beast
540. Deut. 22:4 — Not to leave others distraught with their burdens (but to help either load or unload)
541. Deut. 22:5 — Men must not wear women's clothing
542. Deut. 22:5 — Women must not wear men's clothing
543. Deut. 22:6 — To send away the mother bird before taking its children
544. Deut. 22:7 — To release the mother bird if she was taken from the nest
545. Deut. 22:8 — Not to allow pitfalls and obstacles to remain on one's property
546. Deut. 22:8 — Make a guard rail around flat roofs
547. Deut. 22:9 — Not to eat diverse seeds planted in a vineyard
548. Deut. 22:9 — Not to plant grains or greens in a vineyard
549. Deut. 22:10 — Not to work different animals together
550. Deut. 22:11 — Not to wear shaatnez, a cloth woven of wool and linen
551. Deut. 22:13 — To marry a wife by means of ketubah and kiddushin
552. Deut. 22:19 — The slanderer must remain married to his wife
553. Deut. 22:19 — He must not divorce her
554. Deut. 22:24 — The courts must carry out the death penalty of stoning
555. Deut. 22:29 — The seducer must marry his victim if she is unwed (talks about two couples fornicating, rape is mentioned in Deuteronomy 22:25)
556. Deut. 22:29 — He is never allowed to divorce her
557. Deut. 23:2 — Not to let a eunuch marry into the Jewish people
558. Deut. 23:3 — Not to let a mamzer (a child born due to an illegal relationship) marry into the Jewish people
559. Deut. 23:4 — Not to let Moabite and Ammonite males marry into the Jewish people
560. Deut. 23:7 — Not to offer peace to Ammon and Moab while besieging them
561. Deut. 23:8–9 — Not to refrain from letting a third-generation Egyptian convert enter the Assembly
562. Deut. 23:8–9 — Not to refrain from letting a third-generation Edomite convert enter the Assembly
563. Deut. 23:11 — Impure people must not enter the Temple Mount area
564. Deut. 23:13 — Prepare latrines outside the camps
565. Deut. 23:14 — Prepare a shovel for each soldier to dig with
566. Deut. 23:16 — Not to extradite a slave who fled to (Biblical) Israel
567. Deut. 23:16 — Not to wrong a slave who has come to Israel for refuge
568. Deut. 23:18 — Not to have sexual relations with women not thus married
569. Deut. 23:19 — Not to offer animals bought with the wages of a harlot or the animal exchanged for a dog. Some interpret "exchanged for a dog" as referring to wage of a male prostitute.
570. Deut. 23:20 — Not to borrow with interest
571. Deut. 23:21 — Lend to and borrow from idolaters with interest
572. Deut. 23:22 — Not to withhold payment incurred by any vow
573. Deut. 23:24 — To fulfill what was uttered and to do what was avowed
574. Deut. 23:25 — The hired worker may eat from the unharvested crops where he works
575. Deut. 23:25 — The worker must not take more than he can eat
576. Deut. 23:26 — The worker must not eat while on hired time
577. Deut. 24:1 — To issue a divorce by means of a Get document
578. Deut. 24:4 — A man must not remarry his ex-wife after she has married someone else
579. Deut. 24:5 — He who has taken a wife, built a new home, or planted a vineyard is given a year to rejoice with his possessions
580. Deut. 24:5 — Not to demand from the above any involvement, communal or military
581. Deut. 24:6 — Not to demand as collateral utensils needed for preparing food
582. Deut. 24:8 — The metzora must not remove his signs of impurity
583. Deut. 24:10 — The creditor must not forcibly take collateral
584. Deut. 24:12 — Not to delay its return when needed
585. Deut. 24:13 — Return the collateral to the debtor when needed
586. Deut. 24:15 — Pay wages on the day they were earned
587. Deut. 24:16 — Relatives of the litigants must not testify
588. Deut. 24:17 — Not to demand collateral from a widow
589. Deut. 24:17 — A judge must not pervert a case involving a convert or orphan
590. Deut. 24:19 — To leave the forgotten sheaves in the field
591. Deut. 24:19 — Not to retrieve them
592. Deut. 25:2 — The court must give lashes to the wrongdoer
593. Deut. 25:3 — The court must not exceed the prescribed number of lashes
594. Deut. 25:4 — Not to muzzle an ox while plowing
595. Deut. 25:5 — To perform yibbum (marry the widow of one's childless brother)
596. Deut. 25:5 — The widow must not remarry until the ties with her brother-in-law are removed (by halizah)
597. Deut. 25:9 — To perform halizah (free the widow of one's childless brother from yibbum)
598. Deut. 25:12 — Save someone being pursued even by taking the life of the pursuer
599. Deut. 25:12 — Not to pity the pursuer
600. Deut. 25:13 — Not to possess inaccurate scales and weights even if they are not for use
601. Deut. 25:17 — Remember what Amalek did to the Jewish people
602. Deut. 25:19 — Wipe out the memory of Amalek
603. Deut. 25:19 — Not to forget Amalek's atrocities and ambush on our journey from Egypt in the desert
604. Deut. 26:5 — To read the Torah portion pertaining to the presentation of first fruits
605. Deut. 26:13 — To read the confession of tithes every fourth and seventh year
606. Deut. 26:14 — Not to spend its redemption money on anything but food, drink, or ointment
607. Deut. 26:14 — Not to eat Ma'aser Sheni while impure
608. Deut. 26:14 — A mourner on the first day after death must not eat Ma'aser Sheni
609. Deut. 22:26 — The court must not punish anybody who was forced to commit a crime
610. Deut. 28:9 — To emulate His ways
611. Deut. 31:12 — To assemble all the people on the Sukkot following the seventh year
612. Deut. 31:19 — Each male must write a Sefer Torah
613. Deut. 32:38 — Not to drink wine poured in service to idols

=== Typical order ===
Order as typically presented
1. To know there is a God — Ex. 20:2
2. Not to even think that there are other gods besides Him — Standard: Ex. 20:3; Yemenite: Ex. 20:2
3. To know that God is One — Deut. 6:4
4. To love God —Deut. 6:5
5. To fear God — Deut. 10:20
6. To sanctify God's Name — Lev. 22:32
7. Not to profane God's Name — Lev. 22:32
8. Not to destroy objects associated with God's Name — Deut. 12:4
9. To listen to the prophet speaking in God's Name — Deut. 18:15
10. Not to try the LORD unduly — Deut. 6:16
11. To emulate God's ways — Deut. 28:9
12. To cleave to those who know God — Deut. 10:20
13. To love other Jews — Lev. 19:18
14. To love converts — Deut. 10:19
15. Not to hate fellow Jews — Lev. 19:17
16. To reprove a sinner — Lev. 19:17
17. Not to embarrass others — Lev. 19:17
18. Not to oppress the weak — Ex. 22:21
19. Not to gossip — Lev. 19:16
20. Not to take revenge — Lev. 19:18
21. Not to bear a grudge — Lev. 19:18
22. To learn Torah — Deut. 6:7
23. To honor those who teach and know Torah — Lev. 19:32
24. Not to inquire into idolatry — Lev. 19:4
25. Not to follow the whims of your heart or what your eyes see — Num. 15:39
26. Not to blaspheme — Ex. 22:27
27. Not to worship idols in the manner they are worshiped — Standard: Ex. 20:6; Yemenite: Ex. 20:5
28. Not to worship idols in the four ways we worship God — Standard: Ex. 20:6; Yemenite: Ex. 20:5
29. Not to make an idol for yourself — Standard: Ex. 20:5; Yemenite: Ex. 20:4
30. Not to make an idol for others — Lev. 19:4
31. Not to make human forms even for decorative purposes — Standard: Ex. 20:21; Yemenite: Ex. 20:20
32. Not to turn a city to idolatry — Deut. 13:14
33. To burn a city that has turned to idol worship — Deut. 13:17
34. Not to rebuild it as a city — Deut. 13:17
35. Not to derive benefit from it — Deut. 13:18
36. Not to missionize an individual to idol worship — Deut. 13:12
37. Not to love the idolater — Deut. 13:9
38. Not to cease hating the idolater — Deut. 13:9
39. Not to save the idolater — Deut. 13:9
40. Not to say anything in the idolater's defense — Deut. 13:9
41. Not to refrain from incriminating the idolater — Deut. 13:9
42. Not to prophesy in the name of idolatry — Deut. 13:14
43. Not to listen to a false prophet — Deut. 13:4
44. Not to prophesy falsely in the name of God — Deut. 18:20
45. Not to be afraid of the false prophet — Deut. 18:22
46. Not to swear in the name of an idol — Ex. 23:13
47. Not to perform ov (medium) — Lev. 19:31
48. Not to perform yidoni ("magical seer") — Lev. 19:31
49. Not to pass your children through the fire to Molech — Lev. 18:21
50. Not to erect a pillar in a public place of worship — Deut. 16:22
51. Not to bow down before a smooth stone — Lev. 26:1
52. Not to plant a tree in the Temple courtyard — Deut. 16:21
53. To destroy idols and their accessories — Deut. 12:2
54. Not to derive benefit from idols and their accessories — Deut. 7:26
55. Not to derive benefit from ornaments of idols — Deut. 7:25
56. Not to make a covenant with idolaters —Deut. 7:2
57. Not to show favor to idolaters — Deut. 7:2
58. Not to let idolaters dwell in the Land of Israel — Ex. 23:33
59. Not to imitate idolaters in customs and clothing — Lev. 20:23
60. Not to be superstitious — Lev. 19:26
61. Not to go into a trance to foresee events, etc. — Deut. 18:10
62. Not to engage in divination or soothsaying — Lev. 19:26
63. Not to mutter incantations — Deut. 18:11
64. Not to attempt to contact the dead — Deut. 18:11
65. Not to consult the ov — Deut. 18:11
66. Not to consult the yidoni — Deut. 18:11
67. Not to perform acts of magic — Deut. 18:10
68. Men must not shave the hair off the sides of their head — Lev. 19:27
69. Men must not shave their beards with a razor — Lev. 19:27
70. Men must not wear women's clothing — Deut. 22:5
71. Women must not wear men's clothing — Deut. 22:5
72. Not to tattoo the skin — Lev. 19:28
73. Not to tear the skin in mourning — Deut. 14:1
74. Not to make a bald spot in mourning — Deut. 14:1
75. To repent and confess wrongdoings — Num. 5:7
76. To say the Shema twice daily — Deut. 6:7
77. To pray every day — Ex. 23:25
78. The Kohanim must bless the Jewish nation daily — Num. 6:23
79. To wear tefillin (phylacteries) on the head — Deut. 6:8
80. To bind tefillin on the arm — Deut. 6:8
81. To put a mezuzah on the door post — Deut. 6:9
82. Each male must write a Torah scroll — Deut. 31:19
83. The king must have a separate Torah scroll for himself — Deut. 17:18
84. To have tzitzit on four-cornered garments — Num. 15:38
85. To bless the Almighty after eating — Deut. 8:10
86. To circumcise all males on the eighth day after their birth — Gen. 17:10
87. To rest on the seventh day — Ex. 23:12
88. Not to do prohibited labor on the seventh day — Standard: Ex. 20:11; Yemenite: Ex. 20:10
89. The court must not inflict punishment on Shabbat — Ex. 35:3
90. Not to walk outside the city boundary on Shabbat — Ex. 16:29
91. To sanctify Shabbat with Kiddush and Havdalah — Standard: Ex. 20:9; Yemenite: Ex. 20:8
92. To rest from prohibited labor on Yom Kippur — Lev. 23:32
93. Not to do prohibited labor on Yom Kippur — Lev. 23:32
94. To afflict oneself on Yom Kippur — Lev. 16:29
95. Not to eat or drink on Yom Kippur — Lev. 23:29
96. To rest on the first day of Passover — Lev. 23:7
97. Not to do prohibited labor on the first day of Passover — Lev. 23:8
98. To rest on the seventh day of Passover — Lev. 23:8
99. Not to do prohibited labor on the seventh day of Passover — Lev. 23:8
100. To rest on Shavuot — Lev. 23:21
101. Not to do prohibited labor on Shavuot — Lev. 23:21
102. To rest on Rosh Hashanah — Lev. 23:24
103. Not to do prohibited labor on Rosh Hashanah — Lev. 23:25
104. To rest on Sukkot — Lev. 23:35
105. Not to do prohibited labor on Sukkot — Lev. 23:35
106. To rest on Shemini Atzeret — Lev. 23:36
107. Not to do prohibited labor on Shemini Atzeret —Lev. 23:36
108. Not to eat chametz on the afternoon of the 14th day of Nisan — Deut. 16:3
109. To destroy all chametz on 14th day of Nisan — Ex. 12:15
110. Not to eat chametz all seven days of Passover —Ex. 13:3
111. Not to eat mixtures containing chametz all seven days of Passover — Ex. 12:20
112. Not to see chametz in your domain seven days — Ex. 13:7
113. Not to find chametz in your domain seven days — Ex. 12:19
114. To eat matzah on the first night of Passover — Ex. 12:18
115. To relate the Exodus from Egypt on that night — Ex. 13:8
116. To hear the Shofar on the first day of Tishrei (Rosh Hashanah) — Num. 29:1
117. To dwell in a Sukkah for the seven days of Sukkot — Lev. 23:42
118. To take up a Lulav and Etrog on the first day of Sukkot (in the temple, all seven days) — Lev. 23:40
119. Each man must give a half shekel annually — Ex. 30:13
120. Courts must calculate to determine when a new month begins — Ex. 12:2
121. To afflict oneself and cry out before God in times of calamity — Num. 10:9
122. To marry a wife by means of ketubah and kiddushin — Deut. 22:13
123. Not to have sexual relations with women not thus married — Deut. 23:18
124. Not to withhold food, clothing, and sexual relations from your wife — Ex. 21:10
125. To have children with one's wife — Gen. 1:28
126. To issue a divorce by means of a Get document — Deut. 24:1
127. A man must not remarry his ex-wife after she has married someone else — Deut. 24:4
128. To perform yibbum (marry the widow of one's childless brother) — Deut. 25:5
129. To perform halizah (free the widow of one's childless brother from yibbum) — Deut. 25:9
130. The widow must not remarry until the ties with her brother-in-law are removed (by halizah) — Deut. 25:5
131. The court must fine one who sexually seduces a maiden — Ex. 22:15–16
132. The rapist must marry his victim if she is unwed — Deut. 22:29
133. He is never allowed to divorce her — Deut. 22:29
134. The slanderer must remain married to his wife — Deut. 22:19
135. He must not divorce her — Deut. 22:19
136. To fulfill the laws of the Sotah — Num. 5:30
137. Not to put oil on her meal offering (as usual) — Num. 5:15
138. Not to put frankincense on her meal offering (as usual) — Num. 5:15
139. Not to have sexual relations with your mother — Lev. 18:7
140. Not to have sexual relations with your father's wife — Lev. 18:8
141. Not to have sexual relations with your sister — Lev. 18:9
142. Not to have sexual relations with your father's wife's daughter — Lev. 18:11
143. Not to have sexual relations with your son's daughter — Lev. 18:10
144. Not to have sexual relations with your daughter — Lev. 18:10
145. Not to have sexual relations with your daughter's daughter — Lev. 18:10
146. Not to have sexual relations with a woman and her daughter — Lev. 18:17
147. Not to have sexual relations with a woman and her son's daughter — Lev. 18:17
148. Not to have sexual relations with a woman and her daughter's daughter — Lev. 18:17
149. Not to have sexual relations with your father's sister — Lev. 18:12
150. Not to have sexual relations with your mother's sister — Lev. 18:13
151. Not to have sexual relations with your father's brother's wife — Lev. 18:14
152. Not to have sexual relations with your son's wife — Lev. 18:15
153. Not to have sexual relations with your brother's wife — Lev. 18:16
154. Not to have sexual relations with your wife's sister — Lev. 18:18
155. A man must not have sexual relations with an animal — Lev. 18:23
156. A woman must not have sexual relations with an animal — Lev. 18:23
157. A man must not have sexual relations with a man — Lev. 18:22
158. Not to have sexual relations with your father — Lev. 18:7
159. Not to have sexual relations with your father's brother — Lev. 18:14
160. Not to have sexual relations with someone else's wife — Lev. 18:20
161. Not to have sexual relations with a menstrually impure woman — Lev. 18:19
162. Not to marry non-Jews — Deut. 7:3
163. Not to let Moabite and Ammonite males marry into the Jewish people — Deut. 23:4
164. Not to refrain from letting a third-generation Egyptian convert enter the Assembly — Deut. 23:8–9
165. Not to refrain from letting a third-generation Edomite convert enter the Assembly — Deut. 23:8–9
166. Not to let a mamzer (a child born due to an illegal relationship) marry into the Jewish people — Deut. 23:3
167. Not to let a eunuch marry into the Jewish people — Deut. 23:2
168. Not to offer to God any castrated male animals — Lev. 22:24
169. The High Priest must not marry a widow — Lev. 21:14
170. The High Priest must not have sexual relations with a widow even outside of marriage — Lev. 21:15
171. The High Priest must marry a virgin maiden — Lev. 21:13
172. A Kohen (priest) must not marry a divorcee — Lev. 21:7
173. A Kohen must not marry a zonah (a woman who has had a forbidden sexual relationship) — Lev. 21:7
174. A Kohen must not marry a chalalah ("a desecrated person") (party to or product of 169–172) — Lev. 21:7
175. Not to make pleasurable (sexual) contact with any forbidden woman — Lev. 18:6
176. To examine the signs of animals to distinguish between kosher and non-kosher — Lev. 11:2
177. To examine the signs of fowl to distinguish between kosher and non-kosher — Deut. 14:11
178. To examine the signs of fish to distinguish between kosher and non-kosher — Lev. 11:9
179. To examine the signs of locusts to distinguish between kosher and non-kosher — Lev. 11:21
180. Not to eat non-kosher animals — Lev. 11:4
181. Not to eat non-kosher fowl — Lev. 11:13
182. Not to eat non-kosher fish — Lev. 11:11
183. Not to eat non-kosher flying insects — Deut. 14:19
184. Not to eat non-kosher creatures that crawl on land — Lev. 11:41
185. Not to eat non-kosher maggots — Lev. 11:44
186. Not to eat worms found in fruit on the ground — Lev. 11:42
187. Not to eat creatures that live in water other than (kosher) fish — Lev. 11:43
188. Not to eat the meat of an animal that died without ritual slaughter — Deut. 14:21
189. Not to benefit from an ox condemned to be stoned — Ex. 21:28
190. Not to eat meat of an animal that was mortally wounded — Ex. 22:30
191. Not to eat a limb torn off a living creature — Deut. 12:23
192. Not to eat blood —Lev. 3:17
193. Not to eat certain fats of clean animals — Lev. 3:17
194. Not to eat the sinew of the thigh — Gen. 32:33
195. Not to eat mixtures of milk and meat cooked together — Ex. 23:19
196. Not to cook meat and milk together — Ex. 34:26
197. Not to eat bread from new grain before the Omer — Lev. 23:14
198. Not to eat parched grains from new grain before the Omer — Lev. 23:14
199. Not to eat ripened grains from new grain before the Omer — Lev. 23:14
200. Not to eat fruit of a tree during its first three years — Lev. 19:23
201. Not to eat diverse seeds planted in a vineyard — Deut. 22:9
202. Not to eat untithed fruits — Lev. 22:15
203. Not to drink wine poured in service to idols — Deut. 32:38
204. To ritually slaughter an animal before eating it — Deut. 12:21
205. Not to slaughter an animal and its offspring on the same day — Lev. 22:28
206. To cover the blood (of a slaughtered beast or fowl) with earth — Lev. 17:13
207. To send away the mother bird before taking its children — Deut. 22:6
208. To release the mother bird if she was taken from the nest — Deut. 22:7
209. Not to swear falsely in God's Name — Lev. 19:12
210. Not to take God's Name in vain — Standard: Ex. 20:7; Yemenite: Ex. 20:6
211. Not to deny possession of something entrusted to you — Lev. 19:11
212. Not to swear in denial of a monetary claim — Lev. 19:11
213. To swear in God's Name to confirm the truth when deemed necessary by court — Deut. 10:20
214. To fulfill what was uttered and to do what was avowed — Deut. 23:24
215. Not to break oaths or vows — Num. 30:3
216. For oaths and vows annulled, there are the laws of annulling vows explicit in the Torah — Num. 30:3
217. The Nazirite must let his hair grow — Num. 6:5
218. He must not cut his hair — Num. 6:5
219. He must not drink wine, wine mixtures, or wine vinegar — Num. 6:3
220. He must not eat fresh grapes — Num. 6:3
221. He must not eat raisins — Num. 6:3
222. He must not eat grape seeds — Num. 6:4
223. He must not eat grape skins — Num. 6:4
224. He must not be under the same roof as a corpse — Num. 6:6
225. He must not come into contact with the dead — Num. 6:7
226. He must shave his head after bringing sacrifices upon completion of his Nazirite period — Num. 6:9
227. To estimate the value of people as determined by the Torah —Lev. 27:2
228. To estimate the value of consecrated animals — Lev. 27:12–13
229. To estimate the value of consecrated houses — Lev. 27:14
230. To estimate the value of consecrated fields — Lev. 27:16
231. Carry out the laws of interdicting possessions (cherem) — Lev. 27:28
232. Not to sell the cherem — Lev. 27:28
233. Not to redeem the cherem — Lev. 27:28
234. Not to plant diverse seeds together — Lev. 19:19
235. Not to plant grains or greens in a vineyard — Deut. 22:9
236. Not to crossbreed animals — Lev. 19:19
237. Not to work different animals together — Deut. 22:10
238. Not to wear shaatnez, a cloth woven of wool and linen — Deut. 22:11
239. To leave a corner of the field uncut for the poor — Lev. 19:10
240. Not to reap that corner — Lev. 19:9
241. To leave gleanings — Lev. 19:9
242. Not to gather the gleanings — Lev. 19:9
243. To leave the unformed clusters of grapes — Lev. 19:10
244. Not to pick the unformed clusters of grapes — Lev. 19:10
245. To leave the gleanings of a vineyard — Lev. 19:10
246. Not to gather the gleanings of a vineyard — Lev. 19:10
247. To leave the forgotten sheaves in the field — Deut. 24:19
248. Not to retrieve them — Deut. 24:19
249. To separate the "tithe for the poor" — Deut. 14:28
250. To give charity — Deut. 15:8
251. Not to withhold charity from the poor — Deut. 15:7
252. To set aside Terumah (heave offering) Gedolah (gift for the Kohen) — Deut. 18:4
253. The Levite must set aside a tenth of his tithe — Num. 18:26
254. Not to preface one tithe to the next, but separate them in their proper order — Ex. 22:28
255. A non-Kohen must not eat Terumah — Lev. 22:10
256. A hired worker or a Jewish bondsman of a Kohen must not eat Terumah — Lev. 22:10
257. An uncircumcised Kohen must not eat Terumah — Ex. 12:48
258. An impure Kohen must not eat Terumah — Lev. 22:4
259. A chalalah (party to #s 169-172 above) must not eat Terumah — Lev. 22:12
260. To set aside Ma'aser (tithe) each planting year and give it to a Levite — Num. 18:24
261. To set aside the second tithe (Ma'aser Sheni) — Deut. 14:22
262. Not to spend its redemption money on anything but food, drink, or ointment — Deut. 26:14
263. Not to eat Ma'aser Sheni while impure — Deut. 26:14
264. A mourner on the first day after death must not eat Ma'aser Sheni — Deut. 26:14
265. Not to eat Ma'aser Sheni grains outside Jerusalem — Deut. 12:17
266. Not to eat Ma'aser Sheni wine products outside Jerusalem — Deut. 12:17
267. Not to eat Ma'aser Sheni oil outside Jerusalem — Deut. 12:17
268. The fourth year crops must be totally for holy purposes like Ma'aser Sheni — Lev. 19:24
269. To read the confession of tithes every fourth and seventh year — Deut. 26:13
270. To set aside the first fruits and bring them to the Temple — Ex. 23:19
271. The Kohanim must not eat the first fruits outside Jerusalem — Deut. 12:17
272. To read the Torah portion pertaining to their presentation — Deut. 26:5
273. To set aside a portion of dough for a Kohen — Num. 15:20
274. To give the foreleg, two cheeks, and abomasum of slaughtered animals to a Kohen — Deut. 18:3
275. To give the first shearing of sheep to a Kohen — Deut. 18:4
276. To redeem firstborn sons and give the money to a Kohen — Num. 18:15
277. To redeem the firstborn donkey by giving a lamb to a Kohen — Ex. 13:13
278. To break the neck of the donkey if the owner does not intend to redeem it — Ex. 13:13
279. To rest the land during the seventh year by not doing any work which enhances growth — Ex. 34:21
280. Not to work the land during the seventh year — Lev. 25:4
281. Not to work with trees to produce fruit during that year — Lev. 25:4
282. Not to reap crops that grow wild that year in the normal manner — Lev. 25:5
283. Not to gather grapes which grow wild that year in the normal way — Lev. 25:5
284. To leave free all produce which grew in that year — Ex. 23:11
285. To release all loans during the seventh year — Deut. 15:2
286. Not to pressure or claim from the borrower — Deut. 15:2
287. Not to refrain from lending immediately before the release of the loans for fear of monetary loss —Deut. 15:9
288. The Sanhedrin must count seven groups of seven years — Lev. 25:8
289. The Sanhedrin must sanctify the fiftieth year — Lev. 25:10
290. To blow the Shofar on the tenth of Tishrei to free the slaves — Lev. 25:9
291. Not to work the soil during the fiftieth year (Jubilee) — Lev. 25:11
292. Not to reap in the normal manner that which grows wild in the fiftieth year — Lev. 25:11
293. Not to pick grapes which grew wild in the normal manner in the fiftieth year — Lev. 25:11
294. Carry out the laws of sold family properties — Lev. 25:24
295. Not to sell the land in Israel indefinitely — Lev. 25:23
296. Carry out the laws of houses in walled cities — Lev. 25:29
297. The Tribe of Levi must not be given a portion of the land in Israel, rather they are given cities to dwell in — Deut. 18:1
298. The Levites must not take a share in the spoils of war — Deut. 18:1
299. To give the Levites cities to inhabit and their surrounding fields — Num. 35:2
300. Not to sell the fields but they shall remain the Levites' before and after the Jubilee year — Lev. 25:34
301. To build a Temple — Ex. 25:8
302. Not to build the altar with stones hewn by metal — Standard: Ex. 20:24; Yemenite: Ex. 20:23
303. Not to climb steps to the altar — Standard: Ex. 20:27; Yemenite: Ex. 20:26
304. To show reverence to the Temple — Lev. 19:30
305. To guard the Temple area — Num. 18:2
306. Not to leave the Temple unguarded — Num. 18:5
307. To prepare the anointing oil — Ex. 30:31
308. Not to reproduce the anointing oil — Ex. 30:32
309. Not to anoint with anointing oil — Ex. 30:32
310. Not to reproduce the incense formula — Ex. 30:37
311. Not to burn anything on the Golden Altar besides incense — Ex. 30:9
312. The Levites must transport the ark on their shoulders — Num. 7:9
313. Not to remove the staves from the ark — Ex. 25:15
314. The Levites must work in the Temple — Num. 18:23
315. No Levite must do another's work of either a Kohen or a Levite — Num. 18:3
316. To dedicate the Kohen for service — Lev. 21:8
317. The work of the Kohanim's shifts must be equal during holidays — Deut. 18:6–8
318. The Kohanim must wear their priestly garments during service — Ex. 28:2
319. Not to tear the priestly garments — Ex. 28:32
320. The Kohen Gadol's (High Priest) breastplate must not be loosened from the Efod — Ex. 28:28
321. A Kohen must not enter the Temple intoxicated — Lev. 10:9
322. A Kohen must not enter the Temple with his head uncovered — Lev. 10:6
323. A Kohen must not enter the Temple with torn clothes — Lev. 10:6
324. A Kohen must not enter the Temple indiscriminately — Lev. 16:2
325. A Kohen must not leave the Temple during service — Lev. 10:7
326. To send the impure from the Temple — Num. 5:2
327. Impure people must not enter the Temple — Num. 5:3
328. Impure people must not enter the Temple Mount area — Deut. 23:11
329. Impure Kohanim must not do service in the temple — Lev. 22:2
330. An impure Kohen, following immersion, must wait until after sundown before returning to service — Lev. 22:7
331. A Kohen must wash his hands and feet before service — Ex. 30:19
332. A Kohen with a physical blemish must not enter the sanctuary or approach the altar — Lev. 21:23
333. A Kohen with a physical blemish must not serve — Lev. 21:17
334. A Kohen with a temporary blemish must not serve — Lev. 21:17
335. One who is not a Kohen must not serve — Num. 18:4
336. To offer only unblemished animals — Lev. 22:21
337. Not to dedicate a blemished animal for the altar — Lev. 22:20
338. Not to slaughter it — Lev. 22:22
339. Not to sprinkle its blood — Lev. 22:24
340. Not to burn its fat — Lev. 22:22
341. Not to offer a temporarily blemished animal — Deut. 17:1
342. Not to sacrifice blemished animals even if offered by non-Jews — Lev. 22:25
343. Not to inflict wounds upon dedicated animals — Lev. 22:21
344. To redeem dedicated animals which have become disqualified — Deut. 12:15
345. To offer only animals which are at least eight days old — Lev. 22:27
346. Not to offer animals bought with the wages of a harlot or the animal exchanged for a dog. Some interpret "exchange for a dog" as referring to wage of a male prostitute. — Deut. 23:19
347. Not to burn honey or yeast on the altar — Lev. 2:11
348. To salt all sacrifices — Lev. 2:13
349. Not to omit the salt from sacrifices — Lev. 2:13
350. Carry out the procedure of the burnt offering as prescribed in the Torah — Lev. 1:3
351. Not to eat its meat — Deut. 12:17
352. Carry out the procedure of the sin offering — Lev. 6:18
353. Not to eat the meat of the inner sin offering — Lev. 6:23
354. Not to decapitate a fowl brought as a sin offering — Lev. 5:8
355. Carry out the procedure of the guilt offering — Lev. 7:1
356. The Kohanim must eat the sacrificial meat in the Temple — Ex. 29:33
357. The Kohanim must not eat the meat outside the Temple courtyard — Deut. 12:17
358. A non-Kohen must not eat sacrificial meat — Ex. 29:33
359. To follow the procedure of the peace offering — Lev. 7:11
360. Not to eat the meat of minor sacrifices before sprinkling the blood — Deut. 12:17
361. To bring meal offerings as prescribed in the Torah — Lev. 2:1
362. Not to put oil on the meal offerings of wrongdoers — Lev. 5:11
363. Not to put frankincense on the meal offerings of wrongdoers — Lev. 3:11
364. Not to eat the meal offering of the High Priest — Lev. 6:16
365. Not to bake a meal offering as leavened bread — Lev. 6:10
366. The Kohanim must eat the remains of the meal offerings — Lev. 6:9
367. To bring all avowed and freewill offerings to the Temple on the first subsequent festival — Deut. 12:5–6
368. Not to withhold payment incurred by any vow — Deut. 23:22
369. To offer all sacrifices in the Temple — Deut. 12:11
370. To bring all sacrifices from outside Israel to the Temple — Deut. 12:26
371. Not to slaughter sacrifices outside the courtyard — Lev. 17:4
372. Not to offer any sacrifices outside the courtyard — Deut. 12:13
373. To offer two lambs every day — Num. 28:3
374. To light a fire on the altar every day — Lev. 6:6
375. Not to extinguish this fire — Lev. 6:6
376. To remove the ashes from the altar every day — Lev. 6:3
377. To burn incense every day — Ex. 30:7
378. To light the Menorah every day — Ex. 27:21
379. The Kohen Gadol must bring a meal offering every day — Lev. 6:13
380. To bring two additional lambs as burnt offerings on Shabbat — Num. 28:9
381. To make the show bread — Ex. 25:30
382. To bring additional offerings on Rosh Chodesh (" The New Month") — Num. 28:11
383. To bring additional offerings on Passover — Num. 28:19
384. To offer the wave offering from the meal of the new wheat — Lev. 23:10
385. Each man must count the Omer - seven weeks from the day the new wheat offering was brought — Lev. 23:15
386. To bring additional offerings on Shavuot — Num. 28:26
387. To bring two loaves to accompany the above sacrifice — Lev. 23:17
388. To bring additional offerings on Rosh Hashana — Num. 29:2
389. To bring additional offerings on Yom Kippur — Num. 29:8
390. To bring additional offerings on Sukkot — Num. 29:13
391. To bring additional offerings on Shmini Atzeret — Num. 29:35
392. Not to eat sacrifices which have become unfit or blemished — Deut. 14:3
393. Not to eat from sacrifices offered with improper intentions — Lev. 7:18
394. Not to leave sacrifices past the time allowed for eating them — Lev. 22:30
395. Not to eat from that which was left over — Lev. 19:8
396. Not to eat from sacrifices which became impure — Lev. 7:19
397. An impure person must not eat from sacrifices — Lev. 7:20
398. To burn the leftover sacrifices — Lev. 7:17
399. To burn all impure sacrifices — Lev. 7:19
400. To follow the procedure of Yom Kippur in the sequence prescribed in Parshah Acharei Mot ("After the death of Aaron's sons...") — Lev. 16:3
401. One who profaned property must repay what he profaned plus a fifth and bring a sacrifice — Lev. 5:16
402. Not to work consecrated animals — Deut. 15:19
403. Not to shear the fleece of consecrated animals — Deut. 15:19
404. To slaughter the paschal sacrifice at the specified time — Ex. 12:6
405. Not to slaughter it while in possession of leaven — Ex. 23:18
406. Not to leave the fat overnight — Ex. 23:18
407. To slaughter the second Paschal Lamb — Num. 9:11
408. To eat the Paschal Lamb with matzah and Marror on the night of the fourteenth of Nisan — Ex. 12:8
409. To eat the second Paschal Lamb on the night of the 15th of Iyar — Num. 9:11
410. Not to eat the paschal meat raw or boiled — Ex. 12:9
411. Not to take the paschal meat from the confines of the group — Ex. 12:46
412. An apostate must not eat from it — Ex. 12:43
413. A permanent or temporary hired worker must not eat from it — Ex. 12:45
414. An uncircumcised male must not eat from it — Ex. 12:48
415. Not to break any bones from the paschal offering — Ex. 12:46 Ps. 34:20
416. Not to break any bones from the second paschal offering — Num. 9:12
417. Not to leave any meat from the paschal offering over until morning — Ex. 12:10
418. Not to leave the second paschal meat over until morning — Num. 9:12
419. Not to leave the meat of the holiday offering of the 14th until the 16th — Deut. 16:4
420. To be seen at the Temple on Passover, Shavuot, and Sukkot — Deut. 16:16
421. To celebrate on these three Festivals (bring a peace offering) — Ex. 23:14
422. To rejoice on these three Festivals (bring a peace offering) — Deut. 16:14
423. Not to appear at the Temple without offerings — Deut. 16:16
424. Not to refrain from rejoicing with, and giving gifts to, the Levites — Deut. 12:19
425. To assemble all the people on the Sukkot following the seventh year — Deut. 31:12
426. To set aside the firstborn animals — Ex. 13:12
427. The Kohanim must not eat unblemished firstborn animals outside Jerusalem — Deut. 12:17
428. Not to redeem the firstborn — Num. 18:17
429. Separate the tithe from animals — Lev. 27:32
430. Not to redeem the tithe — Lev. 27:33
431. Every person must bring a sin offering (in the temple) for his transgression — Lev. 4:27
432. Bring an asham talui (temple offering) when uncertain of guilt — Lev. 5:17–18
433. Bring an asham vadai (temple offering) when guilt is ascertained — Lev. 5:25
434. Bring an oleh v'yored (temple offering)(if the person is wealthy, an animal; if poor, a bird or meal offering) — Lev. 5:7–11
435. The Sanhedrin must bring an offering (in the Temple) when it rules in error — Lev. 4:13
436. A woman who had a running (vaginal) issue must bring an offering (in the Temple) after she goes to the Mikveh — Lev. 15:28–29
437. A woman who gave birth must bring an offering (in the Temple) after she goes to the Mikveh — Lev. 12:6
438. A man who had a running (unnatural urinary) issue must bring an offering (in the Temple) after he goes to the Mikveh — Lev. 15:13–14
439. A metzora (one having a skin disease) must bring an offering (in the Temple) after going to the Mikveh — Lev. 14:10
440. Not to substitute another beast for one set apart for sacrifice — Lev. 27:10
441. The new animal, in addition to the substituted one, retains consecration — Lev. 27:10
442. Not to change consecrated animals from one type of offering to another — Lev. 27:26
443. Carry out the laws of impurity of the dead — Num. 19:14
444. Carry out the procedure of the Red Heifer (Para Aduma) — Num. 19:2
445. Carry out the laws of the sprinkling water — Num. 19:21
446. Rule the laws of human tzara'at as prescribed in the Torah — Lev. 13:12
447. The metzora must not remove his signs of impurity — Deut. 24:8
448. The metzora must not shave signs of impurity in his hair — Lev. 13:33
449. The metzora must publicize his condition by tearing his garments, allowing his hair to grow and covering his lips — Lev. 13:45
450. Carry out the prescribed rules for purifying the metzora — Lev. 14:2
451. The metzora must shave off all his hair prior to purification — Lev. 14:9
452. Carry out the laws of tzara'at of clothing — Lev. 13:47
453. Carry out the laws of tzara'at of houses — Lev. 13:34
454. Observe the laws of menstrual impurity — Lev. 15:19
455. Observe the laws of impurity caused by childbirth — Lev. 12:2
456. Observe the laws of impurity caused by a woman's running issue — Lev. 15:25
457. Observe the laws of impurity caused by a man's running issue (irregular ejaculation of infected semen) — Lev. 15:3
458. Observe the laws of impurity caused by a dead beast — Lev. 11:39
459. Observe the laws of impurity caused by the eight shratzim (insects) — Lev. 11:29
460. Observe the laws of impurity of a seminal emission (regular ejaculation, with normal semen) — Lev. 15:16
461. Observe the laws of impurity concerning liquid and solid foods — Lev. 11:34
462. Every impure person must immerse himself in a Mikvah to become pure — Lev. 15:16
463. The court must judge the damages incurred by a goring ox — Ex. 21:28
464. The court must judge the damages incurred by an animal eating — Ex. 22:4
465. The court must judge the damages incurred by a pit — Ex. 21:33
466. The court must judge the damages incurred by fire — Ex. 22:5
467. Not to steal money stealthily — Lev. 19:11
468. The court must implement punitive measures against the thief — Ex. 21:37
469. Each individual must ensure that his scales and weights are accurate — Lev. 19:36
470. Not to commit injustice with scales and weights — Lev. 19:35
471. Not to possess inaccurate scales and weights even if they are not for use — Deut. 25:13
472. Not to move a boundary marker to steal someone's property — Deut. 19:14
473. Not to kidnap — Standard: Ex. 20:14; Yemenite: Ex. 20:13
474. Not to rob openly — Lev. 19:13
475. Not to withhold wages or fail to repay a debt — Lev. 19:13
476. Not to covet and scheme to acquire another's possession — Standard: Ex. 20:15; Yemenite: Ex. 20:14
477. Not to desire another's possession — Standard: Deut. 5:19; Yemenite: Deut. 5:18
478. Return the robbed object or its value — Lev. 5:23
479. Not to ignore a lost object — Deut. 22:3
480. Return the lost object — Deut. 22:1
481. The court must implement laws against the one who assaults another or damages another's property — Ex. 21:18
482. Not to murder — Standard: Ex. 20:13; Yemenite: Ex. 20:12
483. Not to accept monetary restitution to atone for the murderer — Num. 35:31
484. The court must send the accidental murderer to a city of refuge — Num. 35:25
485. Not to accept monetary restitution instead of being sent to a city of refuge — Num. 35:32
486. Not to kill the murderer before he stands trial — Num. 35:12
487. Save someone being pursued even by taking the life of the pursuer — Deut. 25:12
488. Not to pity the pursuer — Num. 35:12
489. Not to stand idly by if someone's life is in danger — Lev. 19:16
490. Designate cities of refuge and prepare routes of access — Deut. 19:3
491. Break the neck of a calf by the river valley following an unsolved murder — Deut. 21:4
492. Not to work nor plant that river valley — Deut. 21:4
493. Not to allow pitfalls and obstacles to remain on your property — Deut. 22:8
494. Make a guard rail around flat roofs — Deut. 22:8
495. Not to put a stumbling block before a blind man (nor give harmful advice) — Lev. 19:14
496. Help another remove the load from a beast which can no longer carry it — Ex. 23:5
497. Help others load their beast — Deut. 22:4
498. Not to leave others distraught with their burdens (but to help either load or unload) — Deut. 22:4
499. Conduct sales according to Torah law — Lev. 25:14
500. Not to overcharge or underpay for an article — Lev. 25:14
501. Not to insult or harm anybody with words — Lev. 25:17
502. Not to cheat a convert monetarily — Ex. 22:20
503. Not to insult or harm a convert with words — Ex. 22:20
504. Purchase a Hebrew slave in accordance with the prescribed laws — Ex. 21:2
505. Not to sell him as a slave is sold — Lev. 25:42
506. Not to work him oppressively — Lev. 25:43
507. Not to allow a non-Jew to work him oppressively — Lev. 25:53
508. Not to have him do menial slave labor — Lev. 25:39
509. Give him gifts when he goes free — Deut. 15:14
510. Not to send him away empty-handed — Deut. 15:13
511. Redeem Jewish maidservants — Ex. 21:8
512. Betroth the Jewish maidservant — Ex. 21:8
513. The master must not sell his maidservant — Ex. 21:8
514. Canaanite slaves must work forever unless injured in one of their limbs — Lev. 25:46
515. Not to extradite a slave who fled to (Biblical) Israel — Deut. 23:16
516. Not to wrong a slave who has come to Israel for refuge — Deut. 23:16
517. The courts must carry out the laws of a hired worker and hired guard — Ex. 22:9
518. Pay wages on the day they were earned — Deut. 24:15
519. Not to delay payment of wages past the agreed time — Lev. 19:13
520. The hired worker may eat from the unharvested crops where he works — Deut. 23:25
521. The worker must not eat while on hired time — Deut. 23:26
522. The worker must not take more than he can eat — Deut. 23:25
523. Not to muzzle an ox while plowing — Deut. 25:4
524. The courts must carry out the laws of a borrower — Ex. 22:13
525. The courts must carry out the laws of an unpaid guard — Ex. 22:6
526. Lend to the poor and destitute — Ex. 22:24
527. Not to press them for payment if you know they don't have it — Ex. 22:24
528. Press the idolater for payment — Deut. 15:3
529. The creditor must not forcibly take collateral — Deut. 24:10
530. Return the collateral to the debtor when needed — Deut. 24:13
531. Not to delay its return when needed — Deut. 24:12
532. Not to demand collateral from a widow — Deut. 24:17
533. Not to demand as collateral utensils needed for preparing food — Deut. 24:6
534. Not to lend with interest — Lev. 25:37
535. Not to borrow with interest — Deut. 23:20
536. Not to intermediate in an interest loan, guarantee, witness, or write the promissory note — Ex. 22:24
537. Lend to and borrow from idolaters with interest — Deut. 23:21
538. The courts must carry out the laws of the plaintiff, admitter, or denier — Ex. 22:8
539. Carry out the laws of the order of inheritance — Num. 27:8
540. Appoint judges — Deut. 16:18
541. Not to appoint judges who are not familiar with judicial procedure — Deut. 1:17
542. Decide by majority in case of disagreement — Ex. 23:2
543. The court must not execute through a majority of one; at least a majority of two is required — Ex. 23:2
544. A judge who presented an acquittal plea must not present an argument for conviction in capital cases — Ex. 23:2
545. The courts must carry out the death penalty of stoning — Deut. 22:24
546. The courts must carry out the death penalty of burning — Lev. 20:14
547. The courts must carry out the death penalty of the sword — Ex. 21:20
548. The courts must carry out the death penalty of strangulation — Lev. 20:10
549. The courts must hang those stoned for blasphemy or idolatry — Deut. 21:22
550. Bury the executed on the day they are killed — Deut. 21:23
551. Not to delay burial overnight — Deut. 21:23
552. The court must not let the sorcerer live — Ex. 22:17
553. The court must give lashes to the wrongdoer — Deut. 25:2
554. The court must not exceed the prescribed number of lashes — Deut. 25:3
555. The court must not kill anybody on circumstantial evidence — Ex. 23:7
556. The court must not punish anybody who was forced to do a crime — Deut. 22:26
557. A judge must not pity the murderer or assaulter at the trial — Deut. 19:13
558. A judge must not have mercy on the poor man at the trial — Lev. 19:15
559. A judge must not respect the great man at the trial — Lev. 19:15
560. A judge must not decide unjustly the case of the habitual transgressor — Ex. 23:6
561. A judge must not pervert justice — Lev. 19:15
562. A judge must not pervert a case involving a convert or orphan — Deut. 24:17
563. Judge righteously — Lev. 19:15
564. The judge must not fear a violent man in judgment — Deut. 1:17
565. Judges must not accept bribes — Ex. 23:8
566. Judges must not accept testimony unless both parties are present — Ex. 23:1
567. Not to curse judges — Ex. 22:27
568. Not to curse the head of state or leader of the Sanhedrin — Ex. 22:27
569. Not to curse any upstanding Jew — Lev. 19:14
570. Anybody who knows evidence must testify in court — Lev. 5:1
571. Carefully interrogate the witness — Deut. 13:15
572. A witness must not serve as a judge in capital crimes — Deut. 19:17
573. Not to accept testimony from a lone witness — Deut. 19:15
574. Transgressors must not testify — Ex. 23:1
575. Relatives of the litigants must not testify — Deut. 24:16
576. Not to testify falsely — Standard: Ex. 20:14; Yemenite: Ex. 20:13
577. Punish the false witnesses as they tried to punish the defendant — Deut. 19:19
578. Act according to the ruling of the Sanhedrin — Deut. 17:11
579. Not to deviate from the word of the Sanhedrin — Deut. 17:11
580. Not to add to the Torah commandments or their oral explanations — Deut. 13:1
581. Not to diminish from the Torah any commandments, in whole or in part — Deut. 13:1
582. Not to curse your father and mother — Ex. 21:17
583. Not to strike your father and mother — Ex. 21:15
584. Respect your father or mother — Standard: Ex. 20:13; Yemenite: Ex. 20:12
585. Fear your mother or father — Lev. 19:3
586. Not to be a rebellious son — Deut. 21:18
587. Mourn for relatives — Lev. 10:19
588. The High Priest must not defile himself for any relative — Lev. 21:11
589. The High Priest must not enter under the same roof as a corpse — Lev. 21:11
590. A Kohen must not defile himself (by going to funerals or cemeteries) for anyone except relatives — Lev. 21:1
591. Appoint a king from Israel — Deut. 17:15
592. Not to appoint a foreigner — Deut. 17:15
593. The king must not have too many wives — Deut. 17:17
594. The king must not have too many horses — Deut. 17:16
595. The king must not have too much silver and gold — Deut. 17:17
596. Destroy the seven Canaanite nations — Deut. 20:17
597. Not to let any of them remain alive — Deut. 20:16
598. Wipe out the memory of Amalek — Deut. 25:19
599. Remember what Amalek did to the Jewish people — Deut. 25:17
600. Not to forget Amalek's atrocities and ambush on our journey from Egypt in the desert — Deut. 25:19
601. Not to dwell permanently in Egypt — Deut. 17:16
602. Offer peace terms to the inhabitants of a city while holding siege, and treat them according to the Torah if they accept the terms — Deut. 20:10
603. Not to offer peace to Ammon and Moab while besieging them — Deut. 23:7
604. Not to destroy food trees even during the siege — Deut. 20:19
605. Prepare latrines outside the camps — Deut. 23:13
606. Prepare a shovel for each soldier to dig with — Deut. 23:14
607. Appoint a priest to speak with the soldiers during the war — Deut. 20:2
608. He who has taken a wife, built a new home, or planted a vineyard is given a year to rejoice with his possessions — Deut. 24:5
609. Not to demand from the above any involvement, communal or military — Deut. 24:5
610. Not to panic and retreat during battle — Deut. 20:3
611. Keep the laws of the captive woman — Deut. 21:11
612. Not to sell her into slavery — Deut. 21:14
613. Not to retain her for servitude after having sexual relations with her — Deut. 21:14

== See also ==
- Jewish ethics
- Laws and customs of the Land of Israel in Judaism

== Bibliography ==
- Eisenberg, Ronald L. The 613 Mitzvot: A Contemporary Guide to the Commandments of Judaism, Rockville, Schreiber Publishing, 2005. ISBN 0-88400-303-5
- Moses Maimonides, translation by Charles Ber Chavel and Moses ibn Tibbon. The book of divine commandments (the Sefer Ha-mitzvoth of Moses Maimonides) London: Soncino Press, 1940.
