= Oshaya =

Oshaya or Oshaia is a Hebrew-language given name and surname. Notable people with the name include:

== Given name ==
- Hoshaiah II, also called Oshaya or Oshaia (died ca. 350 CE), Talmud rabbi
- Abba Hoshaya (also called Oshaya) of Turya (3rd century), pious Jewish wool-washer

== Surname ==
- Efi Oshaya (born 1956), Israeli politician

== See also ==
- Hoshaya, settlement in Northern Israel
