= Yerucham Fishel Perlow =

Polish halakhist (1846-1934)

Rabbi Yehudah Yerucham Fishel Perlow or Perla (1846–1934) was a Polish halakhist, best known for his commentary on Saadia Gaon's enumeration of the 613 commandments.

== Biography ==
He was born in Warsaw. Around the age of 15 he went to Łomża to study under Yehoshua Leib Diskin. Later he studied in the Volozhin Yeshiva and was a leading student of Naftali Zvi Yehuda Berlin. Later he moved to Brest and studied under Chaim Soloveitchik.

He was wealthy, owning a store managed by his wife, and thus refused offers to serve as rabbi of Lublin and Kraków in order to focus on his studies. He possessed one of the largest libraries in Poland at the time.

Between 1913 and 1917 his commentary on Saadia's enumeration of the commandments was published. The commentary was reportedly the work of 40 years. Saadia had written a piyyut enumerating the commandments in a concise manner. Perlow's commentary, in contrast, was originally published in three volumes totalling 1600 pages, and more recently in 7 volumes. It thoroughly examines Saadia's choice of words in the piyyut, and deduces from this Saadia's understanding of each mitzvah, and the halachic consequences that result. Many of the topics covered had not been previously covered systematically in Torah literature, or else Perlow was able to supply new approaches to the subjects.

As an example, Saadia's mention of the commandment of tzitzit is just three words long: בכנפיך ציצית נצח. Perlow examines the third word, meaning "forever", perhaps suggesting that Saadia considered tzitzit obligatory even at night. Perlow concluded, instead, that Saadia meant that tzitzit is obligatory in every generation, despite the absence of techelet. This conclusion leads Perlow to a 20-page discussion of how it is permitted to wear four-corner garments in the absence of techelet, and from there to a discussion of whether a person is permitted to cause himself to enter a situation where he will be obligated but unable to perform a commandment, complete with examples from the Talmud and rishonim.

Perlow was widowed around 1923, and with his children already living far from Warsaw he was left alone. His students convinced him to move to the Land of Israel, and in 1926 he moved to Jerusalem. He died on Thursday night, Rosh Hodesh Adar, in 1934.
