= Orlah =

Forbidden fruit in the Hebrew Bible

Halakhic texts relating to this article
- Torah: Leviticus 19:23–25
- Mishnah: Orlah 3:1
- Jerusalem Talmud: Orlah 20b
- Shulchan Aruch: Yoreh De'ah 294

The prohibition on orlah fruit (lit. "uncircumcised" fruit) is a command found in the Bible not to eat fruit produced by a tree during the first three years after planting.

In rabbinical writings, the orlah prohibition (Hebrew: איסור ערלה) is counted as one of the negative commandments among the 613 commandments. Outside of the land of Israel the prohibition also applies to a certain degree.

== Etymology ==
The Hebrew word orlah literally means "uncircumcised". The use of this term is explained by Shlomo Ephraim Luntschitz as meaning "hidden and sealed" and it alludes to the creation itself.

== Context ==
Commentators generally assume that the law was good agricultural practice, and that early harvesting would conflict with careful cultivation and pruning during the first three years in order to insure later good harvests and allow maturing of the trees. Grape vines produce fruit in three to six years, almond trees produce some flower buds in the fourth year and some fruit in the fifth, and sources from the Ancient Near East suggest that a good crop of dates was expected in the fourth year. In discussing the commandment that the fruit could not actually be eaten until the fifth year, Rooker (2000) notes that in the Code of Hammurabi a tenant-gardener could not eat of the fruit of an orchard until the fifth year, when he shared the produce with the owner.

== Rabbinical writings ==
The Mishna stipulates that Orlah fruit must be burnt to guarantee that no one benefits from them, and even a garment dyed by way of pigment derived from Orlah is to be destroyed. The ancient custom in the Land of Israel was to mark the ground surrounding Orlah-plantings with crushed potsherds (חרסית), so as to signify that the fruit grown on the trees are forbidden to be eaten until after the first three years.

The Sifra points out that the three year count begins on Rosh HaShana (the Jewish new year) and not upon the tree's planting, or on Tu Bishvat (the Jewish agricultural holiday). Thus, the fruit of a tree only two years and 30 days old may not be considered forbidden.

=== Outside of the land of Israel ===
The Jerusalem Talmud stipulates that "safek orlah" (uncertainty if the product is indeed orlah) is permitted outside of the land of Israel. However, Rabbi Yochanan, in a letter sent to Rav Yehudah and quoted in the Babylonian Talmud, took a starkly stringent approach to the common practice of diasporic Jewry being overly lenient on "safek orlah";

Conceal (a) safek (uncertain orlah), and destroy what is orlah for certain, and publicize on their produce that its burial is required. And anybody who says that there is no (prohibition) of orlah outside the land of Israel will not (merit to have) either a great-grandchild or grandchild who cast property ownership in the lot of the congregation of HaShem.

Although orlah is listed in the category of prohibitions pertaining to the Land of Israel (מצווה שתלויה בארץ ישראל), it is one of just two commandments of this category that applies outside of Israel as well. This law is considered a law given to Moses at Sinai. Rabbi Eliezer ben Hurcanus held the opinion that the prohibition of orlah does not apply outside the land of Israel.

=== Questionable fruit ===
Faced with an uncertainty as to whether an item is orlah (or a result of orlah usage such as dye, etc.), the mishna prescribes that such product is permitted for consumption so long as the actual removal of orlah product is not "seen" being picked.

The papaya fruit is a subject of rabbinic dispute, as most of its fruit is harvested in the first three years after planting. Some rabbinic authorities maintain that the papaya is not a tree, thus making it orlah-exempt, whereas most rule that the laws of orlah do apply to the papaya. Papain, (a "second crop" enzyme extracted from the papaya peel, used in beer, biscuits, and as a digestive aid) is likewise under rabbinic scrutiny as a dilution ratio of 200:1 (200 non-orlah fruit to 1 part orlah) is required to permit orlah, essentially prohibiting benefiting from this enzyme.

== Practice in modern Israel ==
The orlah laws are observed to this day by modern Jews. The Chief Rabbinate of Israel has allowed the sale of such fruit to non-Jews, but the usual policy is to destroy it.

== See also ==
- Tu B'Shvat
