= Abba Hoshaya of Turya =

3rd-century pious Jewish wool-washer

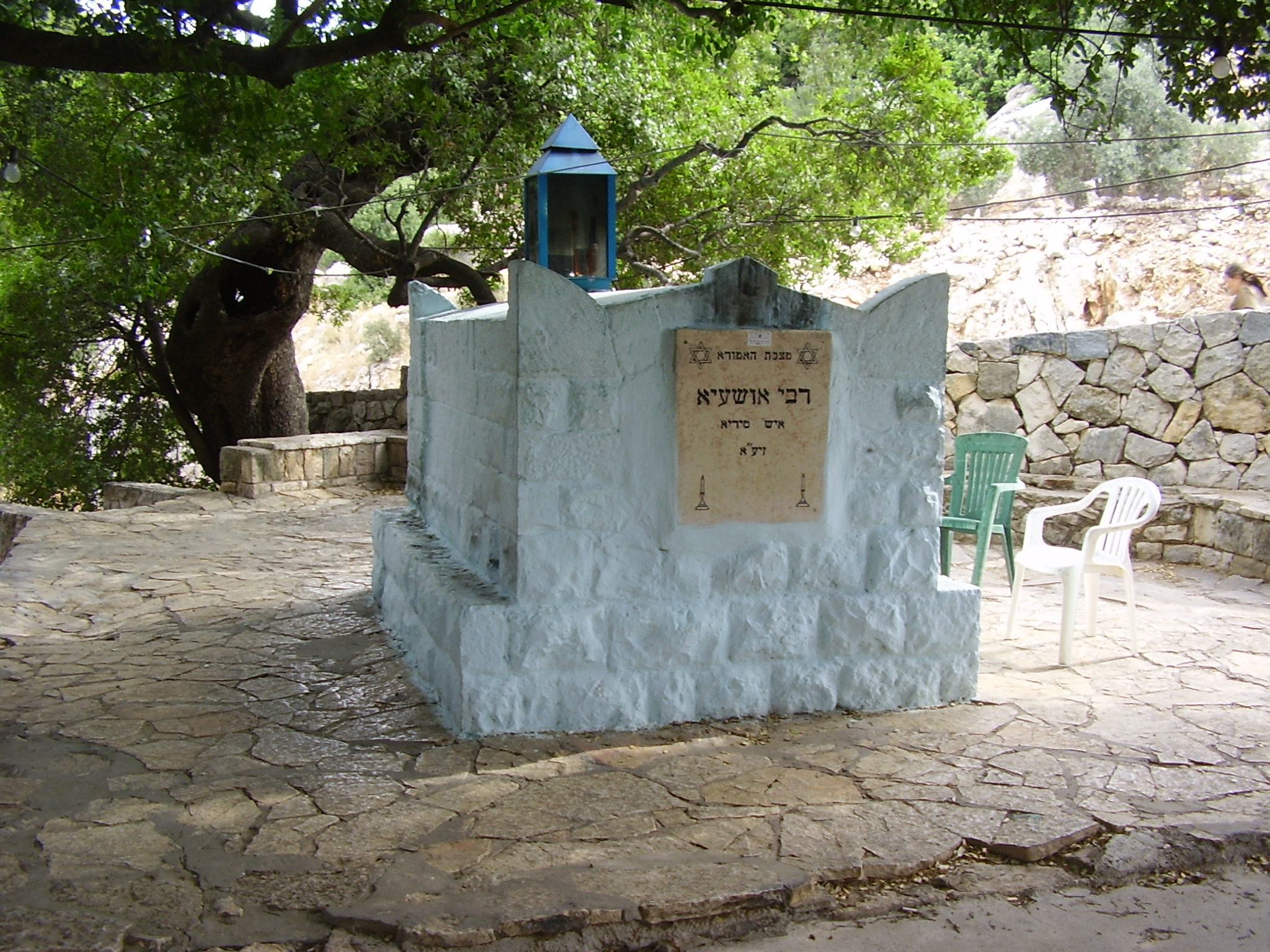
Tomb near Peki'in ascribed according to local tradition to be that of Abba Hoshaya of Turya

Abba Hoshaya (also called Oshaya or Yeshaya) of Turya (or Traya) (Hebrew: אבא אושעיא איש טריא) was a Jewish wool-washer of the third century, of whose scholarly attainments, although unrecorded in outside historical sources, but whose piety and honesty afforded the aggadists opportunities for legends and religious speculations.

He is said to have been born on the day of a certain Rabbi Abun's death, and with reference to this circumstance, Rabbi Abba bar Kahana observes: "What particular wisdom is shown in Solomon's saying (Ecclesiastes 1:5), 'The sun rises, and the sun sets.' Do we not see the alternation of light and darkness daily? The saying refers to a peculiarity in the history of Israel; namely, that there is never a vacancy in the line of pious men: the sun of one saint rises before the sun of another sets. Thus . . . before Rabbi Abun died, Abba Hoshaya had been born" (Genesis Rabbah 58:2; Ecclesiastes Rabbah 1:5. Compare Leopold Zunz, "Gottesdienstliche Vorträge," 2d ed., 185; "Beth Talmud," iv. 11-14). It is related that Abba Hoshaya once found some jewels which a Roman princess had lost. He brought them to her, but she would not accept them, remarking that she did not value them much, and that they belonged to him by right (compare Bava Metzia 28b). Abba replied that the Jewish Law orders the restoration to its owner of anything found; whereupon the princess exclaimed, "Praised be the God of the Jews!" (Jerusalem Talmud, Bava Metzia, Chapter 2, page 8c; compare "Pene Mosheh.") Therefore, at his funeral, the Scriptural verse (Song of Songs 8:7), "If a man would give all the substance of his house for love, it would utterly be contemned," was applied to Abba Hoshaya's love of God (Leviticus Rabbah 30; Shir HaShirim Rabbah to l.c., where "Rabbi" is to be corrected into Abba; Tosefta, Bava Kamma 11:14; Jerusalem Talmud, Bava Kamma, Chapter 10, page 7c).

== Location of Turya ==
According to Yeshayahu Press, Turya or (or Traya) is located near Peki'in. A local tradition ascribes a certain tomb in the area to be that of Abba Hoshaya.
