= I am the Lord thy God =

Opening phrase of the Ten Commandments

"I am the LORD thy God" (KJV, Hebrew: אָֽנֹכִ֖י֙ יְהֹוָ֣ה אֱלֹהֶ֑֔יךָ, romanized: ’Ānōḵî YHWH ’ĕlōheḵā, Ancient Greek: ἐγώ εἰμι ὁ Κύριος ὁ Θεός σου, romanized: egṓ eimi ho Kúrios ho Theós sou) is the opening phrase of the Ten Commandments, which are widely understood as moral imperatives by ancient legal historians and Christian and Jewish biblical scholars.

Chapter 20 of the Book of Exodus begins:

And God spake all these words, saying, I am the LORD thy God, which have brought thee out of the land of Egypt, out of the house of bondage.

— Exodus 20:1-2 (KJV)

The conventional "the Lord" written in small caps in English translations renders יהוה in the Hebrew text (transliterated "YHWH"), the proper name of the God of Israel, reconstructed by modern scholars as Yahweh. The translation "God" renders אֱלֹהִים (transliterated "Elohim"), the normal biblical Hebrew word for "god, deity".

The introduction to the Ten Commandments establishes the identity of God by both his personal name and his historical act of delivering Israel from Egypt. The language and pattern reflects that of ancient royal treaties in which a great king identified himself and his previous gracious acts toward a subject king or people.

Establishing his identity through the use of his proper name, YHWH, and his mighty acts in history distinguishes the God of Israel from the gods of Egypt which were judged in the killing of Egypt's firstborn (Exodus 12) and from the gods of Canaan, the gods of the gentile nations, and the gods that are worshipped as idols, starry hosts, or things found in nature, and the gods known by other proper names. So distinguished, God demands exclusive allegiance from the Israelites. “I am the Lord your God” occurs a number of other times in the Bible also.

== Hebrew Bible ==
By saying, "I am the Lord your God, who brought you out of Egypt, out of the land of slavery", it introduces him by name to establish his authority behind the stipulations that follow. The implicit imperative is to believe that God exists and that his proper name is “YHWH.” By invoking the exodus from Egypt, it also suggests the archetype of God as the redeemer and intervener in history. This verse also serves as the motive clause for the following imperatives.

The text follows an ancient royal treaty pattern, where the speaking monarch begins by identifying himself by name and notable deeds. God thus establishes his position relative to the Israelites, who are expected to render complete submission, allegiance, and obedience to him. The covenant logic establishes an exclusive relationship in which the subject population may have only one sovereign, as expressed explicitly in thou shalt have no other gods before me.

== New Testament ==
Jesus quotes Deuteronomy when tempted to worship Satan in exchange for all the kingdoms of the world.

Jesus said to him, "Away from me, Satan! For it is written: 'Worship the Lord your God, and serve him only'."

— Matthew 4:10 (NIV)

Jesus repeats the Shema as the most important commandment:

Jesus replied: 'Love the Lord your God with all your heart and with all your soul and with all your mind'.

— Matthew 22:37-38 (NIV)

Those who eat food sacrificed to idols are rebuked. Just as in the Hebrew Bible, where sacrificing to other gods is portrayed as sacrificing to demons, idolatry is connected with the worship of demons in the New Testament, and God is described as profoundly jealous of other Divine beings.

…the sacrifices of pagans are offered to demons, not to God, and I do not want you to be participants with demons. You cannot drink the cup of the Lord and the cup of demons too; you cannot have a part in both the Lord's table and the table of demons. Are we trying to arouse the Lord's jealousy? Are we stronger than he?

— 1 Corinthians 10:18-22 (NIV)

The New Testament asserts that God brings consequences to those who worship other gods. God commands "all people everywhere to repent." Idols are described as “worthless things” and people are exhorted to turn away from them to the living God. The teaching of Moses and the experience of Israel when they departed from it are used to support the insistence that believers abstain from idolatry and sexual immorality.

== Roman Catholic doctrine ==
The Catechism of the Catholic Church teaches that “The first commandment summons man to believe in God, to hope in him, and to love him above all else.” It cites the requirement of the Shema, that “You shall love the Lord your God with all your heart, and with all your soul and with all your strength” and the answer Jesus gave when tempted by Satan.

"You shall worship the Lord your God" (Matthew 4:10). Adoring God, praying to him, offering him the worship that belongs to him, fulfilling the promises and vows made to him are acts of the virtue of religion which fall under obedience to the first commandment.

— Catechism of the Catholic Church

In their explanation of the first commandment, the Catechism quotes Justin Martyr's dialogue to support their teaching that Christians and Jews have trusted the same God.

There will be no other God…nor was there from eternity any other existing …but He who made and disposed all this universe. Nor do we think that there is one God for us [Christians], another for you [Jews], but that He alone is God who led your fathers out from Egypt with a strong hand and a high arm. Nor have we trusted in any other (for there is no other), but in Him in whom you also have trusted, the God of Abraham, and of Isaac, and of Jacob.

— Justin Martyr

The Catechism describes the phrase “I am the Lord” at the beginning of the Ten Commandments as an expression of God's existence and his authority.

The first commandment embraces faith, hope, and charity. When we say “God” we confess a constant, unchangeable being, always the same, faithful and just, without any evil. It follows that we must necessarily accept his words and have complete faith in him and acknowledge his authority. He is almighty, merciful, and infinitely beneficent. Who could not place all hope in him? Who could not love him when contemplating the treasures of goodness and love he has poured out on us? Hence the formula God employs in the Scripture at the beginning and end of his commandments: “I am the Lord.”

— Catechism of the Catholic Church

A much longer exposition of the first commandment can be found in part 3 of the Catechism of the Council of Trent.

== Protestant views ==
John Calvin viewed “I am the Lord thy God” as a preface to the Decalogue and “have no other gods” as the first commandment. However, he also allowed for viewing “I am the Lord thy God” as the first commandment, provided one also allows it to serve as a preface to the whole Decalogue. In his commentary on the first commandment, Calvin describes superstition as akin to a wife committing adultery in front of her husband.

…we must beware of superstition, by which our minds are turned aside from the true God, and carried to and fro after a multiplicity of gods. Therefore, if we are contented with one God, let us call to mind what was formerly observed, that all fictitious gods are to be driven far away, and that the worship which he claims for himself is not to be mutilated. Not a particle of his glory is to be withheld: everything belonging to him must be reserved to him entire. The words, “before me,” go to increase the indignity, God being provoked to jealousy whenever we substitute our fictions in his stead; just as an unfaithful wife stings her husband’s heart more deeply when her adultery is committed openly before his eyes.

— John Calvin, Institutes of the Christian Religion

Martin Luther describes the first commandment as prohibiting both the literal honoring of other gods as well as trusting in idols of the heart: money, good works, superstition, etc.

Thus, for example, the heathen who put their trust in power and dominion elevated Jupiter as the supreme god; the others, who were bent upon riches, happiness, or pleasure, and a life of ease, Hercules, Mercury, Venus or others; women with child, Diana or Lucina, and so on; thus every one made that his god to which his heart was inclined, so that even in the mind of the heathen to have a god means to trust and believe. But their error is this that their trust is false and wrong for it is not placed in the only God, besides whom there is truly no God in heaven or upon earth. Therefore the heathen really make their self-invented notions and dreams of God an idol, and put their trust in that which is altogether nothing. Thus it is with all idolatry; for it consists not merely in erecting an image and worshiping it, but rather in the heart, which stands gaping at something else, and seeks help and consolation from creatures, saints, or devils, and neither cares for God, nor looks to Him for so much good as to believe that He is willing to help, neither believes that whatever good it experiences comes from God.

— Martin Luther, Large Catechism, The First Commandment

Like Calvin, Matthew Henry considers “I am the Lord thy God” to be a preface. Henry explains the preface and the first commandment from a covenant viewpoint: God delivered Israel from Egypt, and they belong to him by mutual agreement, so they are bound to obey his covenant stipulations.

The preface of the Law-maker: ’’I am the Lord thy God,’’ v. 2. Herein, 1. God asserts his own authority to enact this law in general: "I am the Lord who command thee all that follows." 2. He proposes himself as the sole object of that religious worship which is enjoined in the first four of the commandments. They are here bound to obedience by a threefold cord, which, one would think, could not easily be broken. (1.) Because God is the Lord—Jehovah, self-existent, independent, eternal, and the fountain of all being and power; therefore he has an incontestable right to command us. He that gives being may give law; and therefore he is able to bear us out in our obedience, to reward it, and to punish our disobedience. (2.) He was their God, a God in covenant with them, their God by their own consent; and, if they would not keep his commandments, who would? He had laid himself under obligations to them by promise, and therefore might justly lay his obligations on them by precept. Though that covenant of peculiarity is now no more, yet there is another, by virtue of which all that are baptized are taken into relation to him as their God, and are therefore unjust, unfaithful, and very ungrateful, if they obey him not. (3.) He had ’’brought them out of the land of Egypt;’’ therefore they were bound in gratitude to obey him, because he had done them so great a kindness, had brought them out of a grievous slavery into a glorious liberty. They themselves had been eye-witnesses of the great things God had done in order to their deliverance, and could not but have observed that every circumstance of it heightened their obligation.

— Matthew Henry

John Wesley makes the common observation that Israel is obligated to obey God's commandments because he delivered them from Egypt, and he adds the observation that Christians are likewise obligated to serve Christ, having been rescued out of bondage to sin.

Herein, God asserts his own authority to enact this law; and proposeth himself as the sole object of that religious worship which is enjoined in the four first commandments. They are here bound to obedience.

1.Because God is the Lord, Jehovah, self - existent, independent, eternal, and the fountain of all being and power; therefore he has an incontestable right to command us. 2. He was their God; a God in covenant with them; their God by their own consent.

He had brought them out of the land of Egypt - Therefore they were bound in gratitude to obey him, because he had brought them out of a grievous slavery into a glorious liberty. By redeeming them, he acquired a farther right to rule them; they owed their service to him, to whom they owed their freedom. And thus, Christ, having rescued us out of the bondage of sin, is entitled to the best service we can do him. The four first commandments, concern our duty to God (commonly called the first - table.) It was fit those should be put first, because man had a Maker to love before he had a neighbour to love, and justice and charity are then only acceptable to God when they flow from the principles of piety.

— John Wesley

John Wesley uses the first commandment in Deuteronomy 5 as a motivation to pose a list of introspective questions.

I think it needful to add a few questions here, which the reader may answer between God and his own soul. Thou shalt have none other gods before me - Hast thou worshipped God in spirit and in truth? Hast thou proposed to thyself no end besides him? Hath he been the end of all thy actions? Hast thou sought for any other happiness, than the knowledge and love of God? Dost thou experimentally know the only true God, and Jesus Christ whom he hath sent? Dost thou love God? Dost thou love him with all thy heart, with all thy soul, and with all thy strength; so as to love nothing else but in that manner and degree which tends to increase thy love of him? Hast thou found happiness in God? Is he the desire of thine eyes, the joy of thy heart? If not, thou hast other gods before him.

— John Wesley

In his exposition of Exodus 20 on the “Thru The Bible” radio program, J. Vernon McGee, quotes Romans 1:21-25 and Colossians 3:5 to support his assertion that the idolatry forbidden by the first commandment includes not only the worship of idols and foreign gods, but also idols of the heart such as greed, alcohol, and sexual immorality.

Anything that you give yourself to, especially in abandonment, becomes your “god.” Many people do not [explicitly] worship Bacchus, the cloven footed Greek and Roman god of wine and revelry of long ago, but they worship the bottle just the same…Whether or not folks realize it, they worship the god Bacchus. Other people worship Aphrodite, the goddess of sex. Some people worship money. Anything you give your time, heart, and soul to, becomes your god. God says we are not to have any gods before Him.

— J. Vernon McGee

== Jewish doctrine ==
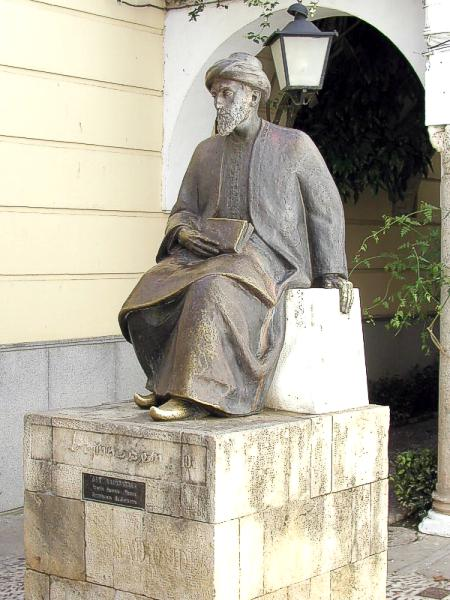
Monument to Maimonides in Córdoba, Spain

"I am the Lord your God who brought you out of the land of Egypt, from the house of slavery. You shall have no other gods before Me..." Maimonides interpreted this as a command requiring one to know there is a God. Ibn Ezra interpreted this as a command to believe that the Lord alone is God. This command prohibits belief in or worship of any additional deities:

Whoever accepts a false god as true, even when he does not actually worship it, disgraces and blasphemes [God's] glorious and awesome name.

— Mishneh Torah, Chapter 2, Halacha 6

The idolater - it doesn't matter whether one commits idolatrous worship or makes a sacrifice or burns incense or pours a libation or prostrates oneself or accepts it as a god or says "you are my god." But whoever embraces it or kisses it or honors it or sprinkles on it or washes it or anoints it or dresses it or puts shoes on it, transgresses a negative commandment. Whoever makes a vow in its name or takes an oath in its name, transgresses a negative commandment.

— Mishnah Sanhedrin 7:6

"Do not make an image or any likeness of what is in the heavens above..." This prohibits the construction or fashioning of "idols" in the likeness of created things (beasts, fish, birds, people) and worshipping them.

The essence of the commandment [forbidding] the worship of false gods is not to serve any of the creations, not an angel, a sphere, or a star, none of the four fundamental elements, nor any entity created from them.

— Mishneh Torah, Chapter 2, Halacha 1

== Other occurrences ==
The phrase "I am the Lord your God" אנכי יהוה אלהיך appears a number of times in the Hebrew Bible outside of the Decalogue.

Thus, Leviticus 18 gives a number of commands prohibiting sexual perversions and the sacrifice of children. It demands that God's people behave differently from the nations around them, lest they be destroyed in the same manner.

I am the Lord your God. You shall not do what is done in the land of Egypt where you lived, nor are you to do what is done in the land of Canaan where I am bringing you; you shall not walk in their statutes. You are to perform My judgments and keep My statutes, to live in accord with them; I am the Lord your God. So you shall keep My statutes and My judgments, by which a man may live if he does them; I am the Lord.

— Leviticus 18:2-5 NASB

In a similar manner, Leviticus 19 gives additional commands regarding separation from mediums and spiritists, the honoring of the aged, and kindness to foreigners.

Do not turn to mediums or spiritists; do not seek them out to be defiled by them. I am the Lord your God. You shall rise up before the gray headed and honor the aged, and you shall revere your God; I am the Lord. When a stranger resides with you in your land, you shall not do him wrong. The stranger who resides with you shall be to you as the native among you, and you shall love him as yourself, for you were aliens in the land of Egypt; I am the Lord your God.

— Leviticus 19:31-34 NASB

The prophet Isaiah asserts that failure to obey the commandments is the reason for Israel's captivity and had the nation obeyed the commandments, they would have had peace like a river.

I am the Lord your God, who teaches you to profit, Who leads you in the way you should go. If only you had paid attention to My commandments! Then your well-being would have been like a river, And your righteousness like the waves of the sea. Your descendants would have been like the sand, And your offspring like its grains; Their name would never be cut off or destroyed from My presence. Go forth from Babylon! Flee from the Chaldeans! Declare with the sound of joyful shouting, proclaim this, Send it out to the end of the earth; Say, “The Lord has redeemed His servant Jacob." They did not thirst when He led them through the deserts He made the water flow out of the rock for them; He split the rock and the water gushed forth. “There is no peace for the wicked," says the Lord.

— Isaiah 48:17-22 NASB

The prophet Joel looks forward to future blessing through which God's people will know that there is none other and will never be put to shame.

You will have plenty to eat and be satisfied And praise the name of the Lord your God, Who has dealt wondrously with you; Then My people will never be put to shame. Thus you will know that I am in the midst of Israel, And that I am the Lord your God, And there is no other; And My people will never be put to shame.

— Joel 2:26-27 NASB

== See also ==
- Biblical law in Christianity
- Monotheism
- The Ten Commandments
- Mahāvākyas
