= Hashavat Aveda =

Hashavat Aveda (Hebrew: השבת אבידה) is a "positive commandment" (i.e., a "thou shalt" instruction) in Jewish law that requires the return of lost property to its rightful owner.

The performance of the mitzvah of reuniting a lost object with its rightful owner obligates the holder of the lost item, whether apparently abandoned, misplaced, or forgotten, even if the owner might have despaired of finding the item or having it returned, to actively seek out the owner in order to return the item to them. If a person becomes "the holder", in this case, of an item that appears to have been lost, a person obligates themself in the performance of the mitzvah by taking the item (as a form of surrogate guardianship) with the intention of finding its owner.

There is a "thou shalt not" corollary to the positive commandment, which forbids one from ignoring the lost item that was found, regardless of whether one knows who the owner is, and even if the owner is known to be one's enemy. Whoever takes an item without the intention of returning it, also transgresses this prohibition; " finders keepers, losers weepers" is not held as an ethical option in Jewish jurisprudence: the item must be taken with the intent to reunite it with its owner.

== The source of the mitzvah ==
This mitzvah includes both affirmative action and prohibition, which are learned from Torah verses.

- The "positive commandment" is mentioned in the Torah portion Mishpatim: "If you come across your enemy’s ox or donkey wandering off, be sure to return it." (Exodus 23:4)

- The corollary "negative commandment" is found in the Torah portion Ki Teitzei admonition: "If you see your brother's ox or sheep straying, do not ignore it but be sure to take it back to him. If the brother does not live near you or if you do not know who he is, take it home with you and keep it until he comes looking for it. Then give it back to him. Do the same if you find your brother's donkey or his cloak or anything he loses. Do not ignore it." (Deuteronomy 22:1–3)

According to Maimonides, during the mitzvah hakhel (a public Torah reading by the King of Israel every seventh year) a large part of the Book of Deuteronomy was read, including the verses that teach about the mitzvah of "hashavat aveda".

== Hashavat Aveda in the laws of the State of Israel ==
The State of Israel has a "hashavat aveda" law, enacted in 1973, regulating the treatment of lost items. Like the Torah statute, it consists of two primary parts:

1. What is required of the finder of a lost item
2. When ownership of the lost item becomes the property of the finder

Unlike the Torah law, the Israeli public law

- does not forbid the finder to ignore the lost item
- only obligates the finder if the item is taken: it can and must only be taken legally with the intent to reunite it with its owner
- notice of the find is to be shared with the police
  - it must be surrendered to the police upon request

Similar to the halakhah (Torah law as informed by responsa and other forms of case law)

- the finder may sell the lost property (after notifying the police) when
  - the lost property is damaged or of noticeably depreciated value, or
  - the costs of maintaining its guardianship would be unreasonable

There is no obligation to try to return a lost item to its owner, nor to inform the police, if the apparent value of the loss is small and it may reasonably be assumed that it is due to the low value of the lost item that the owner abandoned it—a scuffed low-denomination coin found in the street, for example.

After four months, the law regards the original owner as having despaired of the item's return or as having abandoned it in the first place, and it becomes the property of the finder. In the first year after the finder acquires the ownership, the original (losing) owner can demand to redeem the loss, i.e., buy it from the finder, and the finder will have to sell it to him.

== See also ==
- Possession (law)
- Unowned property, which is hefker in Jewish law
- Lost and found
- Lost, mislaid, and abandoned property
- Theft by finding
