= Honour thy father and thy mother =

One of the Ten Commandments

"Honour thy father and thy mother" (Hebrew: כַּבֵּד אֶת אָבִיךָ וְאֶת אִמֶּךָ לְמַעַן יַאֲרִכוּן יָמֶיךָ, romanized: Kabbēḏ ’eṯ-’āḇîḵā wə’eṯ-’immeḵā ləma‘an ya’ăriḵûn yāmeyḵā) is one of the Ten Commandments in the Hebrew Bible. The commandment is generally regarded in Protestant and Jewish sources as the fifth in both the list in Exodus 20:1–21 and in Deuteronomy (Dvarim) 5:1–23. Catholics and Lutherans count this as the fourth.

These commandments were enforced as law in many jurisdictions, and are still considered enforceable law by some. Exodus 20:1 describes the Ten Commandments as being spoken by Yahweh, inscribed on two stone tablets by the finger of God, broken by Moses, and rewritten on replacement stones by the Lord.

== Hebrew Bible ==
כבד את־אביך ואת־אמך למען יארכון ימיך על האדמה אשר־יהוה אלהיך נתן לך
Kabbēḏ ’eṯ-’āḇîḵā wə’eṯ-’immeḵā ləma‘an ya’ăriḵûn yāmeyḵā ‘al hā’ăḏāmāh ’ăšer-Yəhwāh ’ĕlōheyḵā nōṯēn lāḵ.
Honour your father and your mother, so that you may live long in the land the LORD your God is giving you.

— Exodus 20:12 (NIV)

In the Torah, keeping this commandment was associated with individual benefit and with the ability of the nation of Israel to remain in the land to which God was leading them. Dishonouring parents by striking or cursing them was punishable by death and so the clause "so that you may live long" could be interpreted as "so that you are not put to death". In the Talmud, the commandment to honour one's human parents is compared to honoring God. According to the prophet Malachi, God makes the analogy himself:

"A son honours his father, and a servant his master. If I am a father, where is the honour due me? If I am a master, where is the respect due me?" says the LORD Almighty. "It is you, O priests, who show contempt for my name. But you ask, 'How have we shown contempt for your name?'"

— Malachi 1:6 (NIV)

The commandment is repeated eight times throughout the bible.

== Judaism ==
What constitutes "honour?" One must provide them with food and drink and clothing. One should bring them home and take them out, and provide them with all their needs cheerfully.

— Kitzur Shulchan Aruch 143:7

The commandment to honour one's human parents is compared to honouring God, for one owes their existence to their father and their mother.

...Honor the body that bore thee, and the breasts that gave thee suck, maintain thy parents, for thy parents took part in thy creation." For man owes his existence to God, to his father, and to his mother, in that he receives from each of his parents five of the parts of his body, and ten from God. The bones, the veins, the nails, the brain, and the white of the eye come from the father. The mother gives him skin, flesh, blood, hair, and the pupil of the eye. God gives him the following: breath, soul, light of countenance, sight, hearing, speech, touch, sense, insight, and understanding...but if people do not honor their parents, God say: "It is good that I do not dwell among men, or they would have treated Me superciliously, too."

— Legends of the Jews Vol. III

The Talmud says that since there are three partners in the creation of a person (God and two parents), honour showed to parents is the same as honour shown to God. It also compares a number of similarly constructed passages from the Torah and concludes that honour toward parents and honour toward God are intentionally equated:

Our Rabbis taught: It says, 'Honour your father and your mother' (Exodus 20:12), and it says, 'Honor God with your wealth' (Proverbs 3:9). By using the same terminology, the Torah compares the honour you owe your father and mother to the honour you have to give to the Almighty. It also says, 'Every person must respect his mother and his father' (Leviticus 19:3), and it says, 'God your Lord you shall respect, Him you shall serve' (Deuteronomy 10:20). Here the same word, respect, is used. The Torah equates the respect you owe your parents with the respect you must show God. Furthermore, it says, 'Whoever curses his father or mother shall be put to death (Exodus 21:17). And furthermore, it says, 'Anyone that curses God shall bear his sin' (Leviticus 24.–15). By using the same terms the Torah compares cursing of parents with cursing the Almighty.

— Talmud Kiddushin 31

Because honouring parents is part of honouring God, the mitzvah does not depend on the worthiness of the parent: "Even if his father is wicked and a sinner, he must fear and revere him ... A convert to Judaism must not curse or despise his non-Jewish father." (Kitzur Shulchan Aruch 143:13,25)

It also requires honour to one's stepparents or an older sibling who is raising one, and one's teachers, though one has a greater obligation to honor a parent than a grandparent.

=== Historical beliefs ===
Keeping this commandment was associated by the Israelites with the ability of the nation of Israel to remain in the land to which God was leading them. According to the Torah, striking or cursing one's father or mother was punishable by immediate death. In Deuteronomy, a procedure is described for parents to bring a persistently disobedient son to the city elders for death by stoning.

Honouring one's parents is also described in the Torah as an analogue to honouring God. According to the prophet Jeremiah, God refers to himself as Father to Israel, and according to the prophet Isaiah, God refers to Israel as his sons and daughters. According to the prophet Malachi, God calls for similar honour.

According to Jeremiah, God blessed the descendants of Rechab for obeying their forefather's command to not drink wine and uses the family as a counterexample to Israel's failure to obey his command to not worship other gods:

"Will you not learn a lesson and obey my words?" declares the LORD. "Jonadab son of Recab ordered his sons not to drink wine and this command has been kept. To this day they do not drink wine, because they obey their forefather's command. But I have spoken to you again and again, yet you have not obeyed me. Again and again I sent all my servants the prophets to you. They said, 'Each of you must turn from your wicked ways and reform your actions; do not follow other gods to serve them. Then you will live in the land I have given to you and your fathers.' But you have not paid attention or listened to me. The descendants of Jonadab son of Recab have carried out the command their forefather gave them, but these people have not obeyed me."

— Jeremiah 35:12–16 (NIV)

=== Precedence ===
According to the Mishneh Torah, this commandment requires one to honour both of one's parents equally; there is no greater weight given to either the father or the mother. While in some parts of scripture, the father is stated first, in others, the mother comes first. This shows that the honour due to each is equal.

While Jewish teaching holds that a married woman must honour her husband, there are also guidelines for how she may continue to honour her parents:

It is the duty of both men and women to honour their parents. However, a married woman, who owes devotion to her husband, is exempt from the precept of honouring her parents. Yet, she is obliged to do for the parents, all she can, if her husband does not object.

— Kitzur Shulchan Aruch 143:17

=== Requirements ===
The commandment requires one to obey one's parents when the command given by a parent is reasonable and permissible under Jewish law. For example, if a parent asks a child to bring him/her water, he/she must obey. Because honouring God is above all mitzvot, if a parent asks a child to break a law of the Torah, he/she must refuse to obey.

Everything that your father says to you, you are obliged to obey. But if he says to you: "Let us bow down to idols", you must not obey him, lest you become an apostate.

— Midrash, Yalkut Shimoni, Proverbs 960

I am the Lord your God, and both you and your parents are equally bound to honour Me, therefore, you must not hearken to them to disregard My word.

— Kitzur Shulchan Aruch 143:15

A child is not required to obey if a parent says that he/she must marry a particular person, or must not marry a person he/she wishes to marry, provided the marriage is permissible by Jewish law.

A child who is travelling has an obligation to communicate with his/her parents to let them know he/she is safe in order to prevent them from worrying.

A child must continue to honour his/her parent after their deaths. This can be done by reciting Kaddish for 11 months and on the yarzeit (anniversary of the parent's death), and by donating charity in the memory of the parent. The study of the Torah is also considered to be reverence toward a parent, for it shows that a parent raised a worthy child.

A child must never put a parent to shame, or speak arrogantly to a parent. A person who is told to do something by his/her mother for which his father does not like the result is not permitted to tell his/her father that his/her mother said to do that. This is because this could lead to his/her father cursing his/her mother. A child is not permitted to interrupt or contradict a parent, or to disturb a parent's sleep.

== New Testament ==
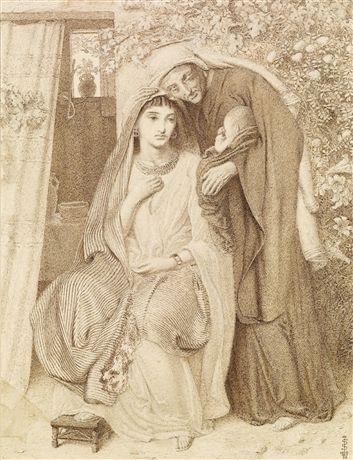
Ruth honoured her widowed mother-in-law Naomi. Simeon Solomon, 1860.

In the gospels of the New Testament, Jesus affirmed the importance of honouring one's father and mother. (Matthew 15:1–9, Matthew 19:17–19, Mark 10:17–19, Luke 18:18–21) Paul quotes the commandment in his letter to the church in Ephesus:

Children, obey your parents in the Lord, for this is right. "Honour your father and mother" (this is the first commandment with a promise), "that it may go well with you and that you may live long in the land." (Ephesians 6:1–2, ESV. See also Colossians 3:20)

— Ephesians 6:1–2 (ESV)

In his letters to the Romans and Timothy, Paul describes disobedience to parents as a serious sin (Romans 1:29–31, 2 Timothy 3:2).

The words of Jesus and the teaching of Paul indicate that adult children remain obligated to honour their parents by providing for material needs. In the gospels, Jesus is portrayed as angry with some people who avoided materially providing for their parents by claiming the money they would have used was given to God (Matthew 15:3–8, Mark 7:9–12. In these passages, Jesus quotes Isaiah 29:13) According to the Gospel of John, when Jesus was on the cross, he provided for his mother, Mary, by giving the Apostle John the charge to care for her, which John accepted.

According to the gospel of Matthew, the obligation to honour one's parents is bounded by one's obligation to God: "Whoever loves father or mother more than me is not worthy of me." (Matthew 10:37 ESV) Such boundaries, and the primacy of the first commandment itself, lead scholars to conclude that honouring one's parents does not include breaking God's law (i.e., committing a sin) at the behest of a parent.

Paul's instructions to Timothy regarding the physical care of widows include the following:

But if a widow has children or grandchildren, these should learn first of all to put their religion into practice by caring for their own family and so repaying their parents and grandparents, for this is pleasing to God.

— 1 Timothy 5:4 (NIV)

== Christian ==
=== Catholicism ===
The import of honouring father and mother is based on the divine origin of the parental role:

The divine fatherhood is the source of human fatherhood. (Ephesians 3:14) This is the foundation of the honour owed to parents. ... It is required by God's commandment. (Exodus 20:12) Respect for parents (filial piety) derives from gratitude toward those who, by the gift of life, their love and their work, have brought their children into the world and enabled them to grow in stature, wisdom, and grace.

According to the teachings of the Catholic Church, the commandment to honour father and mother reveals God's desired order of charity – first God, then parents, then others. Keeping the commandment to honour father and mother brings both spiritual and temporal rewards of peace and prosperity, while failure to honour parents harms the individual as well as society. The pervasive societal effect of obedience or disobedience to this command is attributed to the status of the family as the fundamental building block of society:

The family is the original cell of social life. ...Authority, stability, and a life of relationships within the family constitute the foundations for freedom, security, and fraternity within society. The family is the community in which, from childhood, one can learn moral values, begin to honour God and make good use of freedom. Family life is an initiation into life in society.

The Gospel of Luke notes that, as a child, Jesus was obedient to his earthly parents. For a child in the home, the commandment to honour parents is comprehensive, excluding immoral actions. Grown children, while not obligated to obedience in the same way, should continue to afford respect for parental wishes, advice and teaching. "Filial respect is shown by true docility and obedience. 'My son, keep your father's commandment, and forsake not your mother's teaching. ... When you walk, they will lead you; when you lie down, they will watch over you...'" (Proverbs 6:20–22)

The Church teaches that adult children have a duty to honour their parents by providing "material and moral support in old age and in times of illness, loneliness, or distress". This honour should be based on the son or daughter's gratitude for the life, love and effort given by the parents and motivated by the desire to pay them back in some measure. As stated in Exodus 22:28 that one must not curse God nor curse a ruler of your people on which the teachings of the Catholic Church has based from, the compliance and concept of the commandment is also extended to other persons of all ages outside one's own family such as extended family member belonging on other families, teachers, advisers, and leaders of all institutions and their subordinates which are people who belonged to them including those who impose and enforce laws, agreements, policies, and regulations. The commandment to honour father and mother also forms a basis for charity to others when each person is seen, ultimately, as "a son or daughter of the One who wants to be called 'our Father'." Thus, charitable actions are viewed as extensions of the honour owed to the heavenly Father.

=== Orthodox Church ===
Father Seraphim Stephens sees "Honor" defined as "Love and Respect", and notes that this commandment is positioned between those that address one's obligations to God and those that relate to how one treats others. "It clearly lays the foundation of our relationship to God and to all other people." Richard D. Andrews points out that, "Every time we do something good, just, pure, holy, we bring honour to our parents."

=== Protestantism ===
John Calvin describes the sacred origin of the role of the human father (which thus demands honour). The analogy between the honour of parents and the honour of God himself is further strengthened by this understanding that earthly fatherhood is derived from God's Fatherhood. Thus the duty to honour does not depend on whether the parent is particularly worthy. However, Calvin acknowledges that some fathers are outright wicked and emphasizes there is no excuse for sin in the name of honouring a parent, calling the notion "absurd".

Since, therefore, the name of Father is a sacred one, and is transferred to men by the peculiar goodness of God, the dishonouring of parents redounds to the dishonour of God Himself, nor can anyone despise his father without being guilty of an offence against God, (sacrilegious.) If any should object that there are many ungodly and wicked fathers whom their children cannot regard with honour without destroying the distinction between good and evil, the reply is easy, that the perpetual law of nature is not subverted by the sins of men; and therefore, however unworthy of honour a father may be, that he still retains, inasmuch as he is a father, his right over his children, provided it does not in anywise derogating from the judgement of God; for it is too absurd to think of absolving under any pretext the sins which are condemned by His Law; nay, it would be a base profanation to misuse the name of father for the covering of sins.

— John Calvin, Commentary on Exodus 20:12 and Deuteronomy 5:16

The commentary of John Wesley on the commandment to honour father and mother is consistent with the interpretation in the Catechism of the Catholic Church. He summarizes the actions that express honour as follows: 1. Inward esteem of them, outwardly expressed 2. Obedience to their lawful commands (Ephesians 6:1–3), 3. Submission to their rebukes, instructions and corrections, 4. Acting with consideration of parental advice, direction and consent, 5. Giving comfort and providing for the physical needs of aged parents. Like the Catechism, Wesley also teaches that the commandment includes honouring others in legitimate secular authority. He also encourages people toward honour of those in spiritual leadership with the question, "Have ye all obeyed them that watch over your souls, and esteemed them highly in love for their work's sake?" This question is reminiscent of Paul's statements to the church in Galatia and to Timothy.

Matthew Henry explains that the commandment to honour father and mother applies not only to biological parents but also to those who fulfil the role of mother or father. He uses the example of Esther honouring her guardian and cousin Mordecai:

Mordecai being Esther's guardian or pro-parent, we are told ... How respectful she was to him. Though in relation she was his equal, yet, being in age and dependence his inferior, she honoured him as her father—did his commandment, v. 20. This is an example to orphans; if they fall into the hands of those who love them and take care of them, let them make suitable returns of duty and affection. The less obliged their guardians were in duty to provide for them the more obliged they are in gratitude to honour and obey their guardians.

— Matthew Henry, Commentary on Esther 2

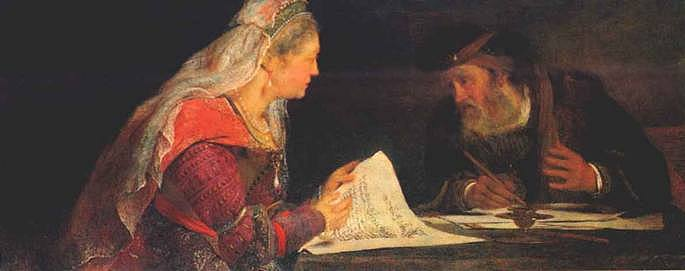
Esther and Mordecai writing the second letter of Purim. Arent de Gelder, ca. 1685. Oil on canvas, RISD Museum of Art, Providence RI

The commandment itself encourages obedience "so that you may enjoy long life and that it may go well with you". Henry, Wesley and Calvin affirm the applicability of this promise for all who keep the commandment, though each notes that for the New Testament Christian, the promise may be fulfilled as earthly rewards and/or heavenly rewards, as God sees fit in his wisdom and love for the individual.

In his commentary, Calvin notes the harsh consequences required in Exodus and Leviticus for specific failures to keep the commandment. Those who struck or cursed a parent were to be sentenced to death. Persistently disobedient sons were to be brought before the city elders and stoned by the whole community if the parents' testimony was judged to be accurate. Calvin writes that God knew capital punishment for these offences would seem harsh and be difficult to pronounce, even for those responsible for adjudicating the situation. This is why, he argues, the text specifically places responsibility for the consequences on the offender. The severity of the sentence emphasized the importance of removing such behaviour from the community and deterring others who might imitate it.

Although Calvin refers mostly to fathers in his commentary on the commandment to honour father and mother, he writes near the beginning that the commandment mentions both parents on purpose. As described above, Proverbs supports the value of guidance from both father and mother, and Paul specified that children should provide for their own widowed mothers and grandmothers, "which is pleasing to God".

Just as "honour" involves offering profound respect, the opposite of honouring someone is to trivialize him, as if of no importance.

Respect is not something based solely on personal or professional qualifications, but also on the position that God has given that person. In 1 Samuel 26 David spares Saul's life, even at the risk of losing his own, submitting to the authority God had placed over him as anointed king.

The Protestant tradition, more broadly, has applied the fifth commandment to political authority by way of synecdoche. This idea was especially prominent in the early Protestant movement, whether Reformed, Anglican, or Lutheran, and was embedded in Protestant political thinking by the seventeenth century.

== Rewards and consequences ==
This commandment is distinct from the others in that a promise is attached to it: "...so that you may live long in the land the Lord your God is giving you." Deuteronomy 5:16 amplifies this: "...that your days may be prolonged, and that it may be well with you, in the land which the Lord your God is giving you."

As with most terms of the covenant between God and Israel, there are consequences for disobedience as well as rewards for obedience:

Just as the reward for honouring father and mother is very great, the punishment for transgressing it is very great. And the one who afflicts his parents causes the shechinah [presence of God] to separate from him and harsh decrees fall upon him and he is given many sufferings. And even if life smiles on him in this life, he will surely be punished in the World to Come.

— Kitzur Shulchan Aruch 143:4

== See also ==
- Biblical law in Christianity
- Filial piety
- Pietas
