= Genesis 34 =

Genesis 34 may refer to:

- Vayishlach, the Jewish parashah which covers this chapter from the Book of Genesis
- Dinah, whose story is related in this chapter
