= Alice Shalvi =

Israeli professor and educator (1926–2023)

- אליס שלוי
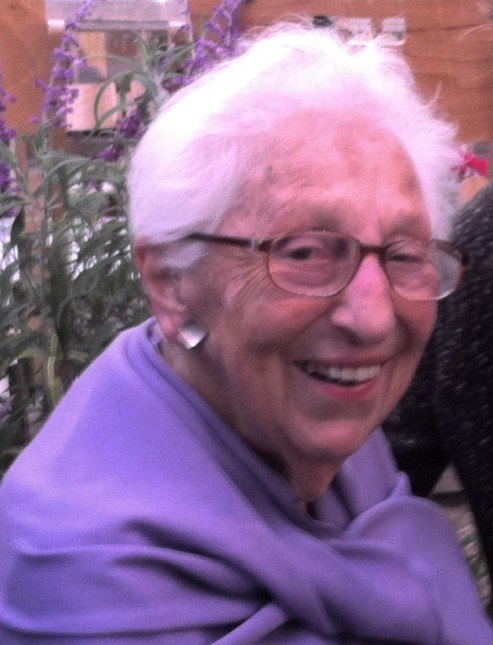
- Shalvi in 2013
- Born: Alice Hildegard Margulies; 16 October 1926; Essen, Rhine Province, Prussia, Germany
- Died: 2 October 2023 (aged 96)
- Occupations: Professor of English literature, educator, women's activism
- Spouse: Moshe Shalvi
- Children: 6

Alice Shalvi (Hebrew: אליס שלוי; 16 October 1926 – 2 October 2023) was an Israeli professor and educator. She played a leading role in progressive Jewish education for girls and advancing the status of women.

== Biography ==
Alice Hildegard Margulies (later Shalvi) was born in Essen, Germany, to an Orthodox Jewish family. Her parents, Benzion and Perl Margulies, were religious Zionists. Alice was the younger of two children. The family had a wholesale linen and housewares business.

In 1933, soon after Hitler's rise to power in Germany, the family home was searched, prompting their move to London in May 1934. In London, Shalvi's father and brother imported watches and jewellery. When the Blitz began, they moved to Aylesbury, 50 kilometres north of London, and lived in a small house in Waddesdon, which was part of the estate of James Rothschild.

The family built a factory there for ammunition calibration devices that established them financially. In 1944, Shalvi studied English literature at Cambridge University. In 1946, she was sent to the 22nd Zionist Congress in Basel as a representative of British Jewish students.

In 1949, after completing a degree in social work at the London School of Economics, Shalvi immigrated to Israel, settling in Jerusalem. She became a faculty member in the English department of the Hebrew University of Jerusalem, and earned her PhD there in 1962.

In May 1950 she met Moshe Shelkowitz (later Shalvi), a new immigrant from New York City, whom she married in October of that year. They had six children: Joel (b. 1952), Micha (b. 1954), Ditza (b. 1957), Hephzibah (b. 1960), Benzion (b. 1963) and Pnina (Perl, b. 1967).

Moshe Shalvi died on 6 July 2013. Alice Shalvi died on 2 October 2023, at the age of 96.

== Academic and public career ==
Shalvi headed the English literature departments at the Hebrew University of Jerusalem and Ben-Gurion University of the Negev. She was the founder of Pelech, an experimental school for religious girls that unconventionally taught Talmud (1975–1990), and of the Ohalim movement of neighbourhood associations (1973–1979); she was also founding director (later chairwoman) of the Israel Women's Network (1984–2000). In this position, she was one of the most prominent feminist advocates in Israel, developing a program that covers most forms of discrimination and disadvantage faced by women in Israeli society. An important aim of her work was gaining acceptance of Israeli women's contributions in all sections and at all levels of the armed forces, since army service plays a significant role in Israeli economic, political, and social life. In the 1990s she founded the International Coalition for Agunah Rights. She also served as rector of the Schechter Institute for four years. Shalvi also served as a member of the advisory board of the Remember the Women Institute In 2018 she published a memoir entitled Never A Native.

Nurit Jacobs-Yinon and Avigail Sperber produced a documentary film entitled, Alice. Last Conversation, about her life which previewed at the 2026 Haifa Film Festival. Rabbi Tamar Elad-Appelbaum, who had been her student in the Pelech School for Girls, interviewed Shalvi in 2023, shortly before her death, about her struggles as an educator, feminist, and human rights activist. Using archival footage together with interviews the film highlights her courage and the difficulties she faced in her battles to improve religious girls' education and in the fight to make women more visible, with more rights, which led to the creation of the Israel Women's Network.

== Awards and recognition ==
- In 1989, Shalvi received the Emil Grunzweig Human Rights Award, as founder of the Israel Women's Network.
- In 2000, Brown University awarded her a Doctor of Humane Letters.
- In 2007, she was awarded the Israel Prize for her lifetime achievement and special contribution to society and the State of Israel.
- In 2009, she was co-recipient (with Rabbi Arik Ascherman) of the Leibowitz Prize, named to commemorate Yeshayahu Leibowitz, presented by the Yesh Din human rights organisation for public activism in the spirit of Leibowitz's political and philosophical teaching.
- Shalvi was a member of the board of The Israel/Palestine Center for Research and Information.
- In 2017, she was honored with the Sylvan Adams Nefesh B'Nefesh Bonei Zion Prize Lifetime Achievement Award.
- In 2018, she was awarded the National Jewish Book Award for Women's Studies for her book Never a Native.
- In 2026 the documentary Alice. Last Conversation premiered at the Haifa Film Festival

== Published works ==
- Jewish Women: A Comprehensive Historical Encyclopedia
- Studies in English language and literature, 1966
- The relationship of Renaissance concepts of honour to Shakespeare's problem plays, 1972
- Never a native, 2018

== See also ==
- List of Israel Prize recipients
- Jewish feminism
- Women in Israel
