= Tamar Elad-Appelbaum =

Israeli Conservative rabbi

Tamar Elad-Appelbaum תמר אלעד–אפלבום
- Title: Rabbi

Personal life
- Born: תמר אלעד–אפלבום Jerusalem

Religious life
- Religion: Judaism
- Denomination: "egalitarian, traditional and experimental" (from the Kehillat Zion definition)

Tamar Elad-Appelbaum (Hebrew: תמר אלעד–אפלבום; born 1974 or 1975), also known simply as Rabbi Tamar and Rabba Tamar, is an Israeli rabbi. She is the founder of Kehilat Zion, an egalitarian, traditional, and experimental congregation in Jerusalem.

== Early life and education ==
Elad-Appelbaum's maternal grandfather was from Delme, France and was a member of the Loren Group of the French Resistance during World War II. Her paternal grandfather hailed from Casablanca, Morocco.

Elad-Appelbaum was born and raised in Jerusalem in a religious Zionist Orthodox family "that at times verged on Charedi". From a young age, she pushed to learn Torah and Talmud, something not traditional for her faith community. At age 14, her parents sent her to Pelech, a high school where girls were allowed to study Talmud, despite some pushback from extended family.

After graduating from high school, Elad-Appelbaum served in the Israeli army. As part of her service, she was sent to the American state of New Jersey, where she was exposed to Reform and Conservative Jews for the first time.

She attended Hebrew University of Jerusalem, where she earned a bachelor's degree in Jewish philosophy. After graduating, a friend convinced her she should study to be a rabbi. Her Orthodox husband, whom she had married the month prior, was supportive of this idea. Elad-Appelbaum studied at the Schechter Institute of Jewish Studies, and was ordained there in 2005.

Her brother, Nadav Elad, died while serving as a paratrooper in the IDF.

== Career ==
Elad-Appelbaum has served congregations in Omer, Tel Aviv, and White Plains, New York.

Elad-Appelbaum became assistant dean at the Schechter Rabbinical Seminary in 2010. In 2011, she resigned from the position. According to The Jerusalem Post, her decision was rooted in the seminary's refusal to ordain LGBTQ students.

In 2013, she founded the Kehillat Zion community in Baka, Jerusalem. The community calls itself "egalitarian, traditional and experimental," and uses a unique liturgy which combines aspects from multiple Jewish traditions. It comprised about 150 families in 2019.

Elad-Appelbaum is the co-director of the Shalom Hartman Institute's Center for Ritual.

She has also co-founded Beit Midrash for Israeli Rabbis, a non-denominational rabbinic seminary connected to the HaMidrasha Educational Center for Israeli Judaism and the Shalom Hartman Institute.

In 2019, Elad-Appelbaum helped to translate a liturgical poem, titled Eileh Ezkerah for Pittsburg, honoring the victims of the 2018 Pittsburgh synagogue shooting into Hebrew.

In 2022, Elad-Appelbaum was the commencement speaker for Hebrew College in the U.S. state of Massachusetts.

Elad-Appelbaum provided pastoral care to displaced Israelis following the October 7, 2023 attacks in Israel.

Elad-Appelbaum interviewed her teacher and former school principal, Alice Shalvi, as part of the documentary, Alice.Last Conversation, which premiered at the 42nd Haifa International Film Festival in October, 2026.

=== Interfaith activism ===
In 2016, Elad-Appelbaum helped organize "Amen—A House of Prayer for All Believers", a project that created a shared prayer space in Jerusalem for Jews, Christians, and Muslims.

== Publications ==
- Elad-Appelbaum, Tamar (September 2010). "Process Theology and Eretz Yisrael: Why the State of Israel Desperately Needs Rabbi Artson's Process Theology". Conservative Judaism. 62 (1–2): 122–126. doi:10.1353/coj.2010.0031. ISSN 1947-4717.
- Elad-Appelbaum, Tamar (March 2011). "Our Eyes Shall Yet See It". Conservative Judaism. 62 (3–4): 22–33. doi:10.1353/coj.2011.0008. ISSN 1947-4717.
