= Vayishlach =

Eighth portion in the annual Jewish cycle of weekly Torah reading

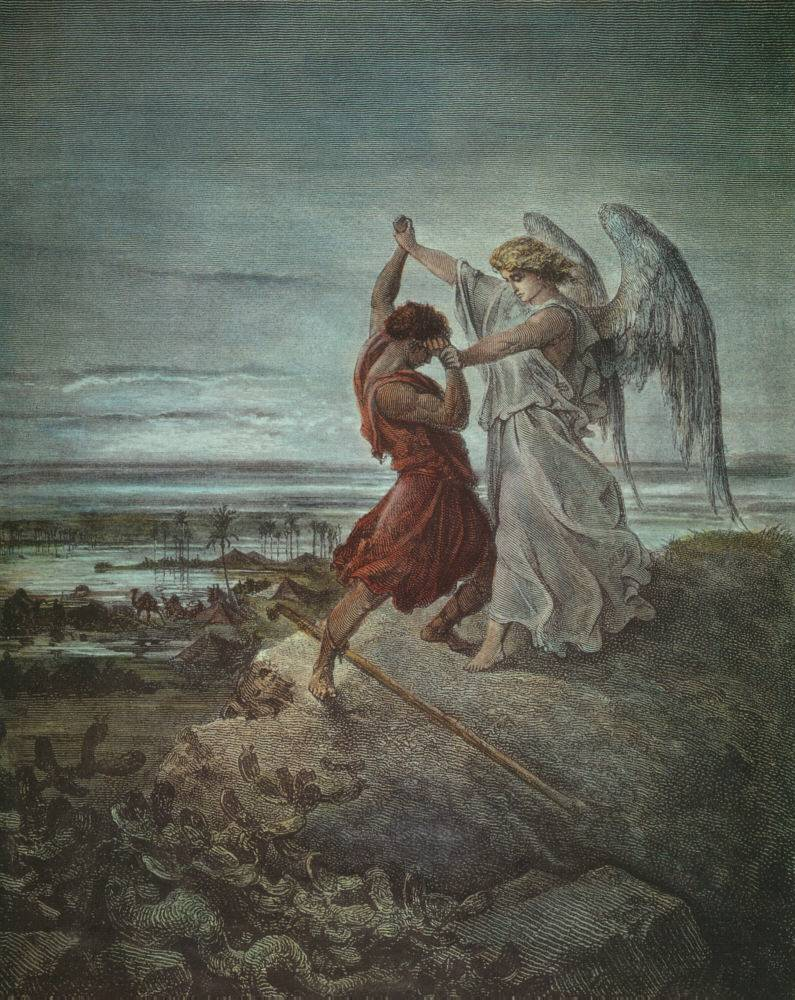
Jacob Wrestling with the Angel (1855 illustration by Gustave Doré)

Vayishlach (Biblical Hebrew: וַיִּשְׁלַח, romanized: Wayyišlaḥ, lit. 'and he sent', the first word of the weekly Torah portion) is the eighth weekly Torah portion in the annual Jewish cycle of Torah reading. In the parashah, Jacob reconciles with Esau after wrestling with a "man." The prince Shechem rapes Dinah, whose brothers sack the city of Shechem in revenge. In the family's subsequent flight, Rachel gives birth to Benjamin and dies in childbirth.

The parashah constitutes Genesis 32:4–36:43. The parashah has the most verses of any weekly Torah portion in the Book of Genesis (Parashat Miketz has the most letters, Parashat Vayeira has the most words, and Parashat Noach has an equal number of verses as Parashat Vayishlach). It is made up of 7,458 Hebrew letters, 1,976 Hebrew words, 153 verses, and 237 lines in a Torah scroll. Jews read it the eighth Shabbat after Simchat Torah, in November or December.

== Readings ==
=== Traditional annual cycle ===
In the traditional annual Torah reading cycle, Parashat Vayishlach is divided into seven readings (aliyot) and a concluding maftir reading:

Reading (Aliyah)	Verses (Genesis)	Summary of events	Masoretic divisions
1st (Rishon)	32:4–13	Jacob sends messengers to Esau, learns Esau is approaching with 400 men, divides his camp in two, and prays to God for deliverance.	None
2nd (Sheni)	32:14–30	Jacob sends droves of livestock ahead to appease Esau, crosses the Jabbok River, wrestles with a "man" until dawn, and receives the name Israel.	None
3rd (Shlishi)	32:31–33:5	Jacob names the site Peniel, limps from his hip injury (origin of the gid ha-nasheh prohibition), and reunites with Esau.	None
4th (Revi'i)	33:6–20	Esau accepts Jacob's gifts and returns to Seir; Jacob travels to Succoth and later buys land outside Shechem, building an altar there.	Two closed portions (setumot) at 33:17 and 33:20
5th (Chamishi)	34:1–35:11	Shechem assaults Dinah; Simeon and Levi avenge her by slaying the men of Shechem; Jacob moves to Bethel, where Deborah dies and God reaffirms his name Israel.	One open portion (petuchah) at 34:31
6th (Shishi)	35:12–36:19	Rachel dies giving birth to Benjamin; Reuben lies with Bilhah; Isaac dies at 180 and is buried by Jacob and Esau; Esau's descendants are listed.	Two open portions (petuchot) at 35:29 and 36:19
7th (Shvi'i)	36:20–43	Genealogies of the kings who reigned in Edom and the chiefs descended from Esau.	Two open portions (petuchot) at 36:30 and 36:43
Maftir	36:40–43	Concluding repetition of the chiefs of Esau.	Ends at the final open portion (36:43)

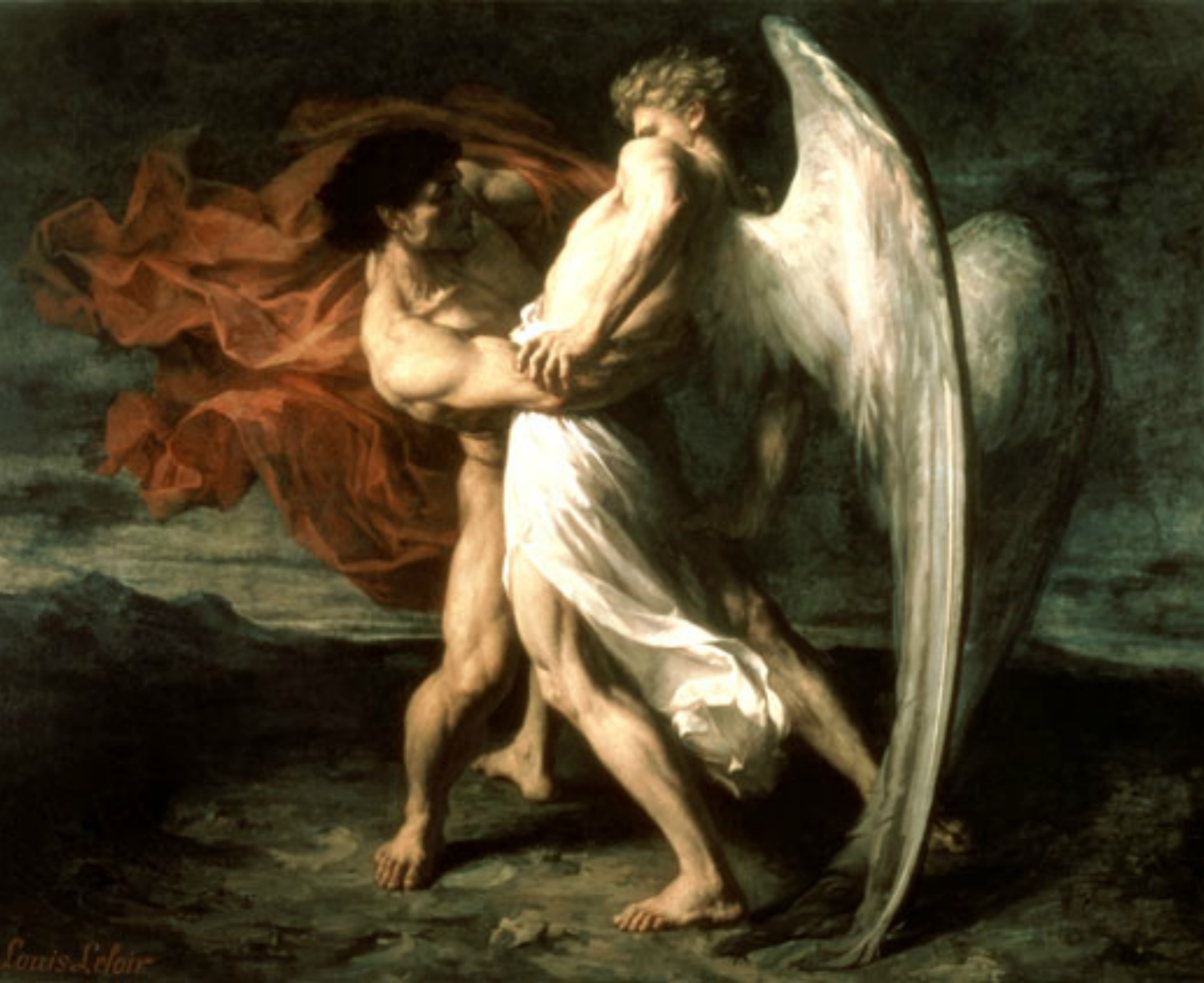
Jacob Wrestling with the Angel (1865 painting by Alexander Louis Leloir)

=== First reading—Genesis 32:4–13 ===
In the very first reading, Jacob sent a message to his brother Esau in Edom that he had stayed with Laban until then, had oxen, donkeys, flocks, and servants, and hoped to find favor in Esau's sight. The messengers returned and greatly frightened Jacob with the report that Esau was coming to meet him with 400 men. Jacob divided his camp in two, reasoning that if Esau destroyed one of the two, then the other camp could escape. Jacob prayed to God, recalling that God had promised to return him whole to his country, noting his unworthiness for God's transformation of him from a poor man with just a staff to the leader of two camps, and prayed God to deliver him from Esau, as God had promised Jacob good and to make his descendants as numerous as the sand of the sea.

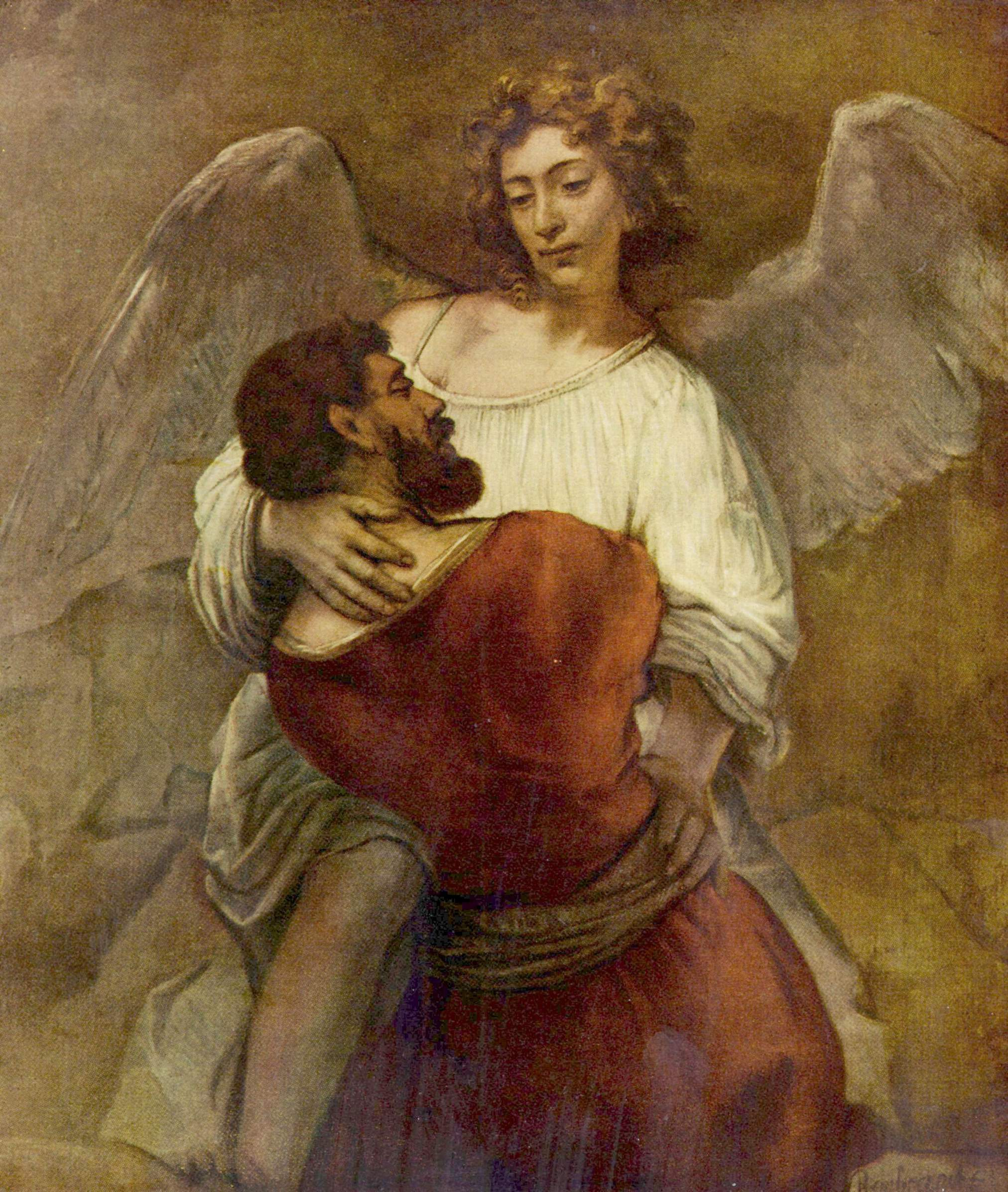
Jacob Wrestling with the Angel (1659 painting by Rembrandt)

=== Second reading—Genesis 32:14–30 ===
In the second reading, Jacob assembled a present of hundreds of goats, sheep, camels, cattle, and donkeys to appease Esau and instructed his servants to deliver them to Esau in successive droves with the message that they were a present from his servant Jacob, who followed behind. As the presents went before him, Jacob took his wives, handmaids, children, and belongings over the Jabbok River, and then remained behind that night alone. Jacob wrestled with a "man" until dawn, and when the "man" saw that he was not prevailing, he touched the hollow of Jacob's thigh and strained it. The man asked Jacob to let him go, for the day was breaking, but Jacob would not let him go without a blessing. The man asked Jacob his name, and when Jacob replied "Jacob," the man told him that his name would no more be Jacob, but Israel, for he had striven with God and with men and prevailed. Jacob asked the "man" his name, but the "man" asked him why and then blessed him.

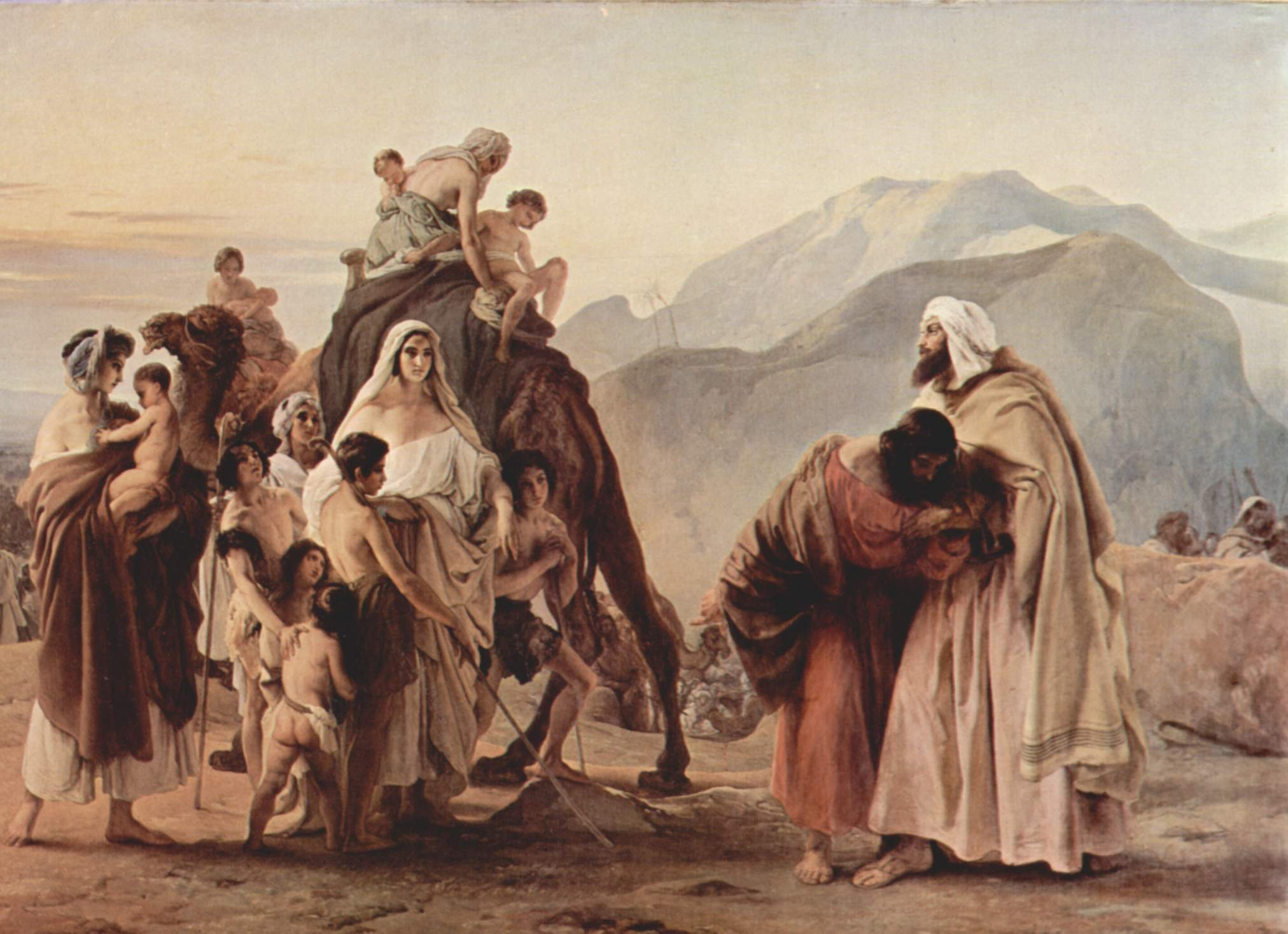
The Reunion of Jacob and Esau (1844 painting by Francesco Hayez)

=== Third reading—Genesis 32:31–33:5 ===
In the third reading, Jacob named the place Peniel, saying that he had seen God face to face and lived. At sunrise, Jacob limped from the injury to his thigh. Because of this, Jews do not eat the sinew of the vein that is the hollow of the thigh because the man touched the hollow of Jacob's thigh. When Jacob saw Esau coming with 400 men, he divided his family, putting the handmaids and their children foremost, Leah and her children next, and Rachel and Joseph at the back. Jacob went before them and bowed to the ground seven times as he approached his brother.

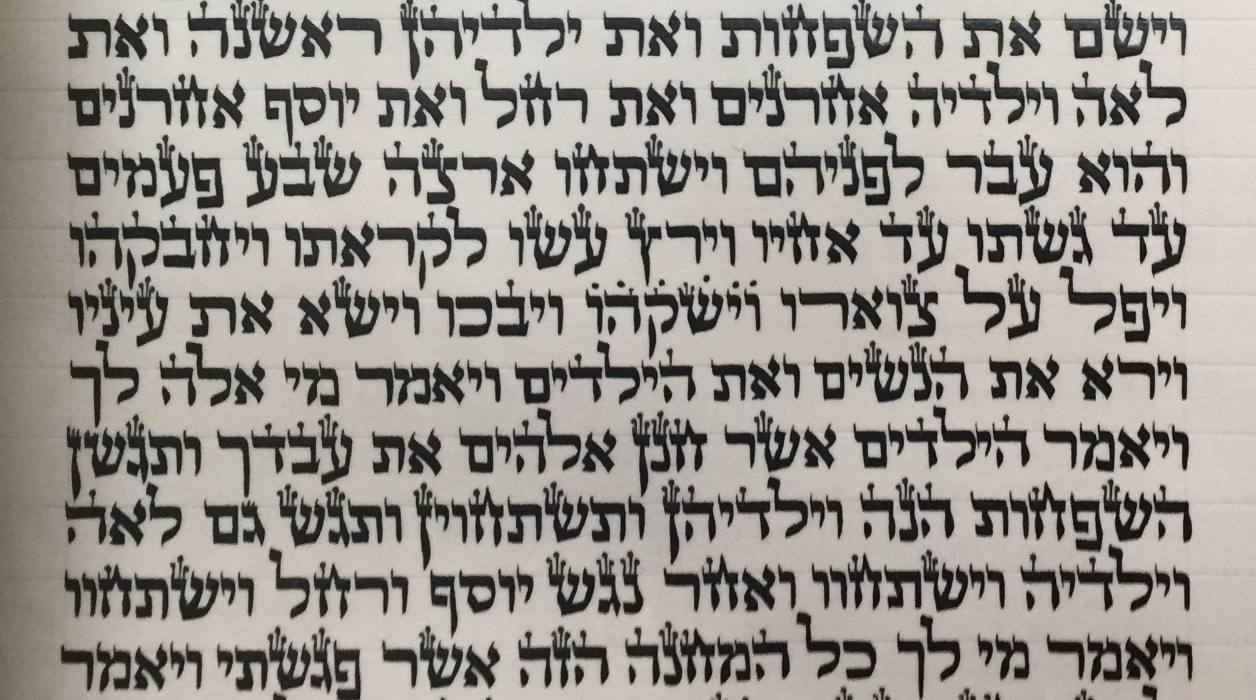
The word וַיִּשָּׁקֵהוּ is written with dots on top of each letter in a scroll.

Esau ran to meet him, embraced him, and kissed him, and they wept. Esau asked who the women and children were. In 33:4, the word וַיִּשָּׁקֵהוּ is written with dots on top of each letter in a scroll.

=== Fourth reading—Genesis 33:6–20 ===
In the fourth reading, Jacob told Esau that the women and children were his, and they all came to Esau and bowed down. Esau asked what Jacob meant by all the livestock, and Jacob told him that he sought Esau's favor. Esau said that he had enough, but Jacob pressed him to accept his present, saying that seeing Esau's face was like seeing the face of God, and Esau took the gifts. Esau suggested that Jacob and he travel together, but Jacob asked that Esau allow Jacob's party to travel more slowly so as not to tax the young children and the flocks until they came to Esau in Seir. Esau offered to leave some of his men behind with Jacob, but Jacob declined. So Esau left for Seir, and Jacob left for Sukkot (meaning "booths"), where he built a house and made booths for his cattle, thus explaining the place's name.

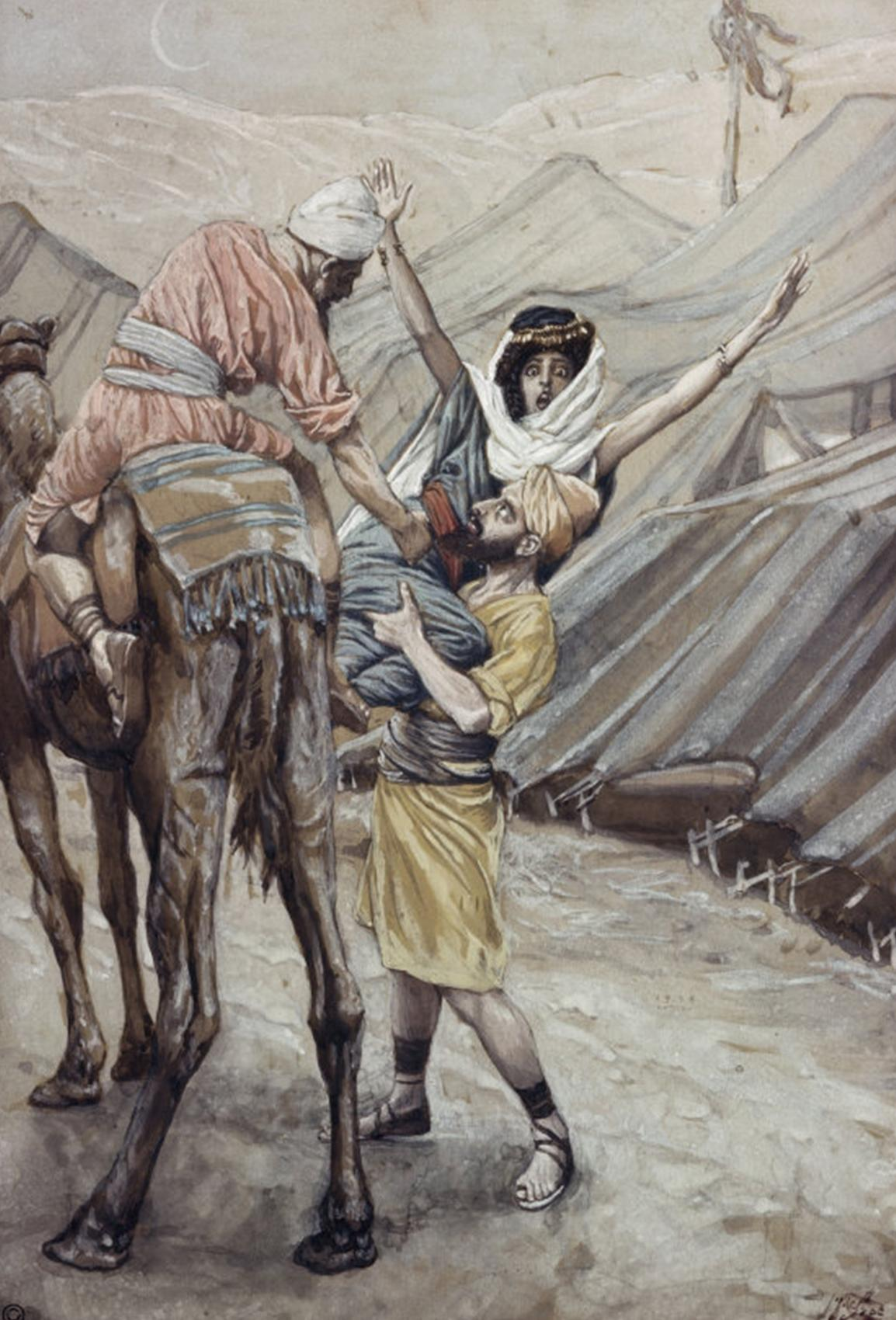
Dinah (watercolor circa 1896–1902 by James Tissot)

In the continuation of the reading, Jacob came to Shechem, where he bought a parcel of ground outside the city from the children of Hamor for a hundred pieces of money. Jacob erected an altar there and called the place El-elohe-Israel.

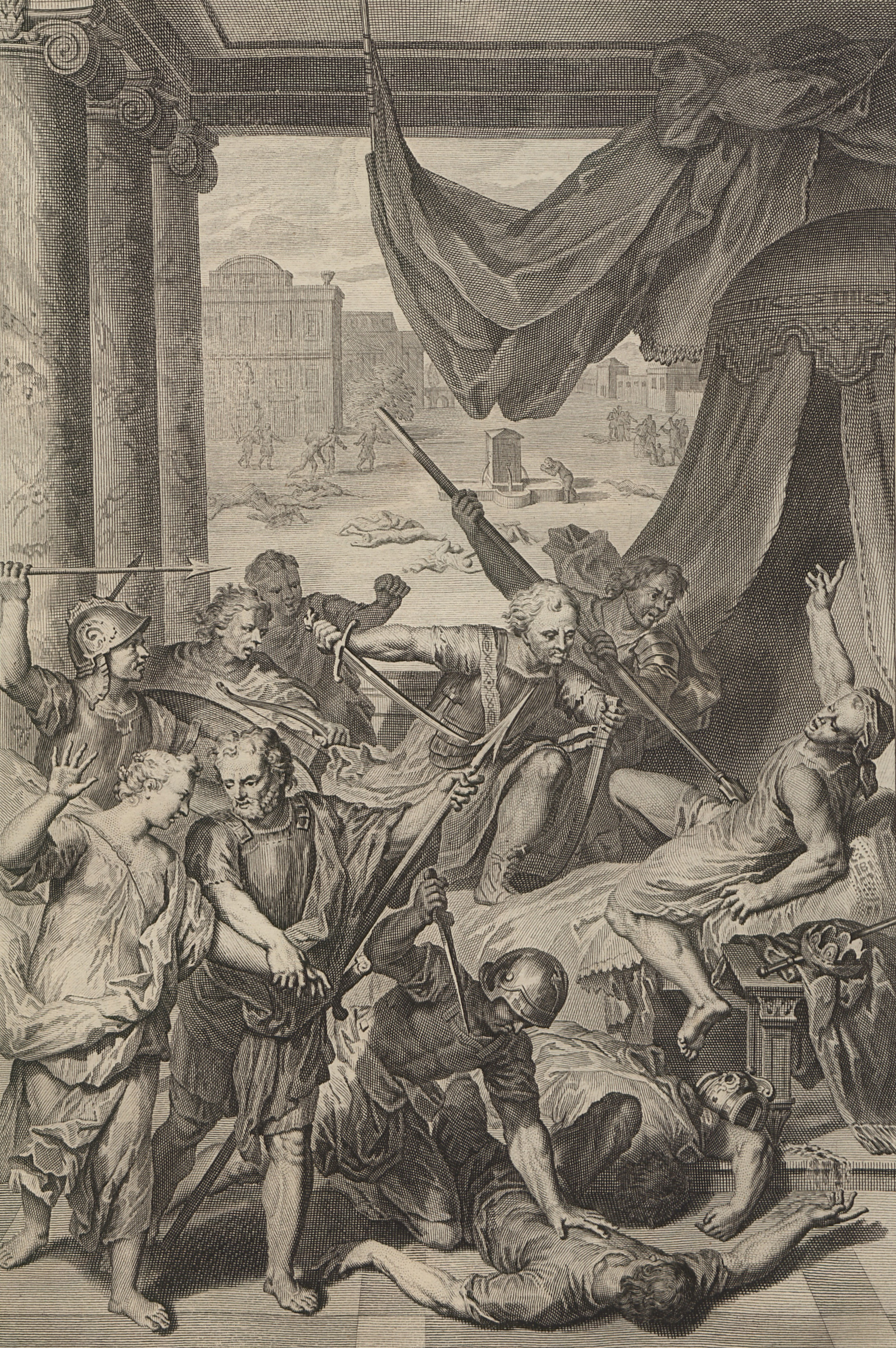
Simeon and Levi Slay the Shechemites (illustration from the 1728 Figures de la Bible)

=== Fifth reading—Genesis 34:1–35:11 ===
In the fifth reading, in chapter 34, when Dinah went out to see the daughters of the land, the prince of the land, Shechem, the son of Hamor the Hivite, saw her and lay with her by force. Shechem loved Dinah and asked Hamor to arrange that he might marry her. Jacob heard that Shechem had defiled Dinah while Jacob's sons were in the field, and Jacob held his peace until they returned. When Jacob's sons heard, they came in from the field very angry. Hamor went out to Jacob and told him that Shechem longed for Dinah and asked Jacob to give her to him for a wife and to agree that their two people might intermarry and live and trade together. And Shechem offered to give Jacob and his sons whatever they wanted as a bride price. Jacob's sons answered with guile, saying that they could not give their sister to one not circumcised, and said that they would consent only on the condition that every man of the town became circumcised and then the two people might intermarry and live together; otherwise they would leave. Their words pleased Hamor and Shechem, and Shechem did so without delay, out of delight with Dinah. Hamor and Shechem spoke to the men of the city in the city gate, saying that Jacob's family were peaceable, and advocated letting them dwell in the land, trade, and intermarry. Hamor and Shechem reported that Jacob's people would only do so on the condition that every man of the town was circumcised, and they argued that the men do so, for Jacob's animals and wealth would add to the city's wealth. The men heeded Hamor and Shechem, and every man of the city underwent circumcision. On the third day, when the men of the city were in pain, Jacob's sons Simeon and Levi each took his sword, came upon the city with stealth, and killed all the men, including Hamor and Shechem, and took Dinah out of the city. Jacob's sons looted the city, taking as booty their animals, their wealth, their wives, and their children. Jacob told Simeon and Levi that they had made him odious to the inhabitants of the land, who would gather together against him and destroy their family. Simeon and Levi asked whether they were to allow someone to treat their sister as a prostitute.

As the reading continues in chapter 35, God told Jacob to move to Bethel and make an altar there to God, who had appeared to him there when he first fled from Esau. Jacob told his household to put away their idols, change their garments, and purify themselves for the trip to Bethel, and they gave Jacob all their idols and earrings, and Jacob buried them under the terebinth by or near Shechem. A terror of God fell upon the nearby cities so that the people did not pursue Jacob, and they journeyed to Luz, built an altar, and called the place El-beth-el. Rebekah's nurse Deborah died, and they buried her below Beth-el under an oak they called Allon-bacuth. God appeared to Jacob again and blessed him, saying to him that his name would not be Jacob any more, but Israel. God told him to be fruitful and multiply, for nations and kings would descend from him.

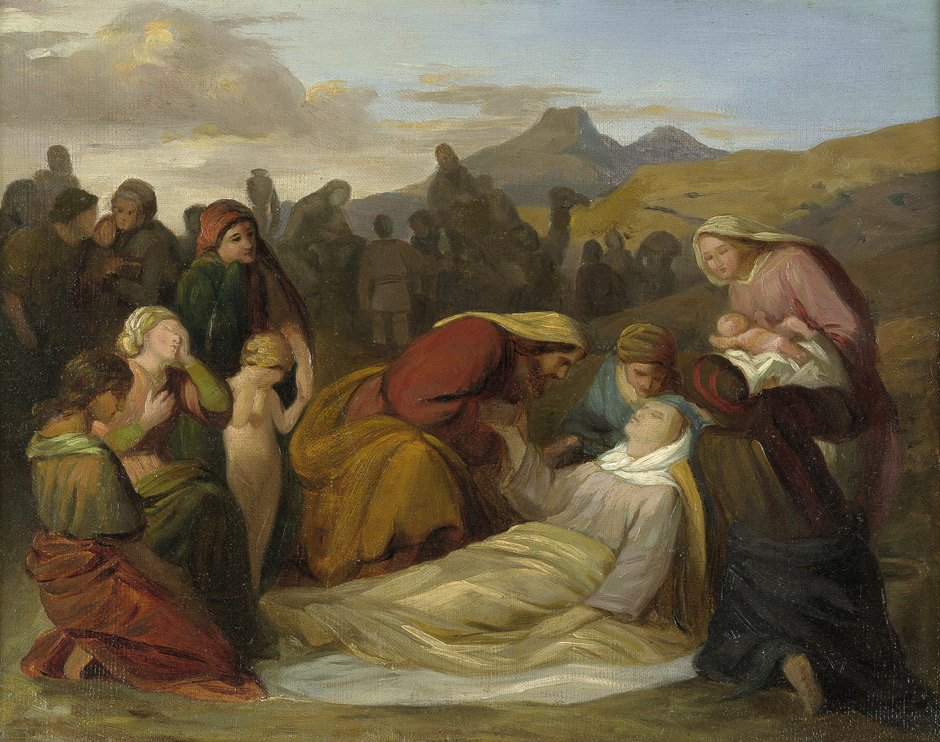
The Death of Rachel (painting circa 1847 by Gustav Ferdinand Metz)

=== Sixth reading—Genesis 35:12–36:19 ===
In the sixth reading, God told Jacob that God would give Jacob and his descendants the land that God gave to Abraham and Isaac. Jacob set up a pillar of stone in the place, poured a drink offering and oil on it, and called the place Bethel. They left Bethel, and before they had come to Ephrath, Rachel went into a difficult labor. The midwife told her not to fear, for this child would also be a son for her. Just before Rachel died, she named her son Ben-oni, but Jacob called him Benjamin. They buried Rachel on the road to Ephrath at Bethlehem, and Jacob set up a pillar on her grave. Israel journeyed beyond Migdal-Eder. While Israel dwelt in that land, Reuben lay with Jacob's concubine Bilhah, and Israel heard of it. The text then recounts Jacob's children born to him in Padan-aram. Jacob came to Isaac at Hebron, Isaac died aged 180, and Esau and Jacob buried him.

As the reading continues in chapter 36, the text recounts Esau's children. Esau took his household, animals, and all his possessions that he had gathered in Canaan and went to a land apart from Jacob, in Edom, for their substance was too great for them to dwell together. The text then recounts Esau's descendants, among whom were Amalek.

=== Seventh reading—Genesis 36:20–43 ===
In the seventh reading, the text enumerates the descendants of Seir the Horite.

In the continuation of the reading, the text lists the Kings of Edom. The maftir (מפטיר) reading of Genesis 36:40–43 that concludes the parashah lists the chiefs of Esau.

=== Readings according to the triennial cycle ===
Jews who read the Torah according to the triennial cycle of Torah reading read the parashah according to the following schedule:

	Year 1	Year 2	Year 3
	2025, 2028, 2031 . . .	2026, 2029, 2032 . . .	2027, 2030, 2033 . . .
Reading	32:4–33:20	34:1–35:15	35:16–36:43
1	32:4–6	34:1–4	35:16–26
2	32:7–9	34:5–12	35:27–29
3	32:10–13	34:13–17	36:1–8
4	32:14–22	34:18–23	36:9–19
5	32:23–30	34:24–31	36:20–30
6	32:31–33:5	35:1–11	36:31–39
7	33:6–20	35:12–15	36:40–43
Maftir	33:18–20	35:12–15	36:40–43

== In inner-Biblical interpretation ==
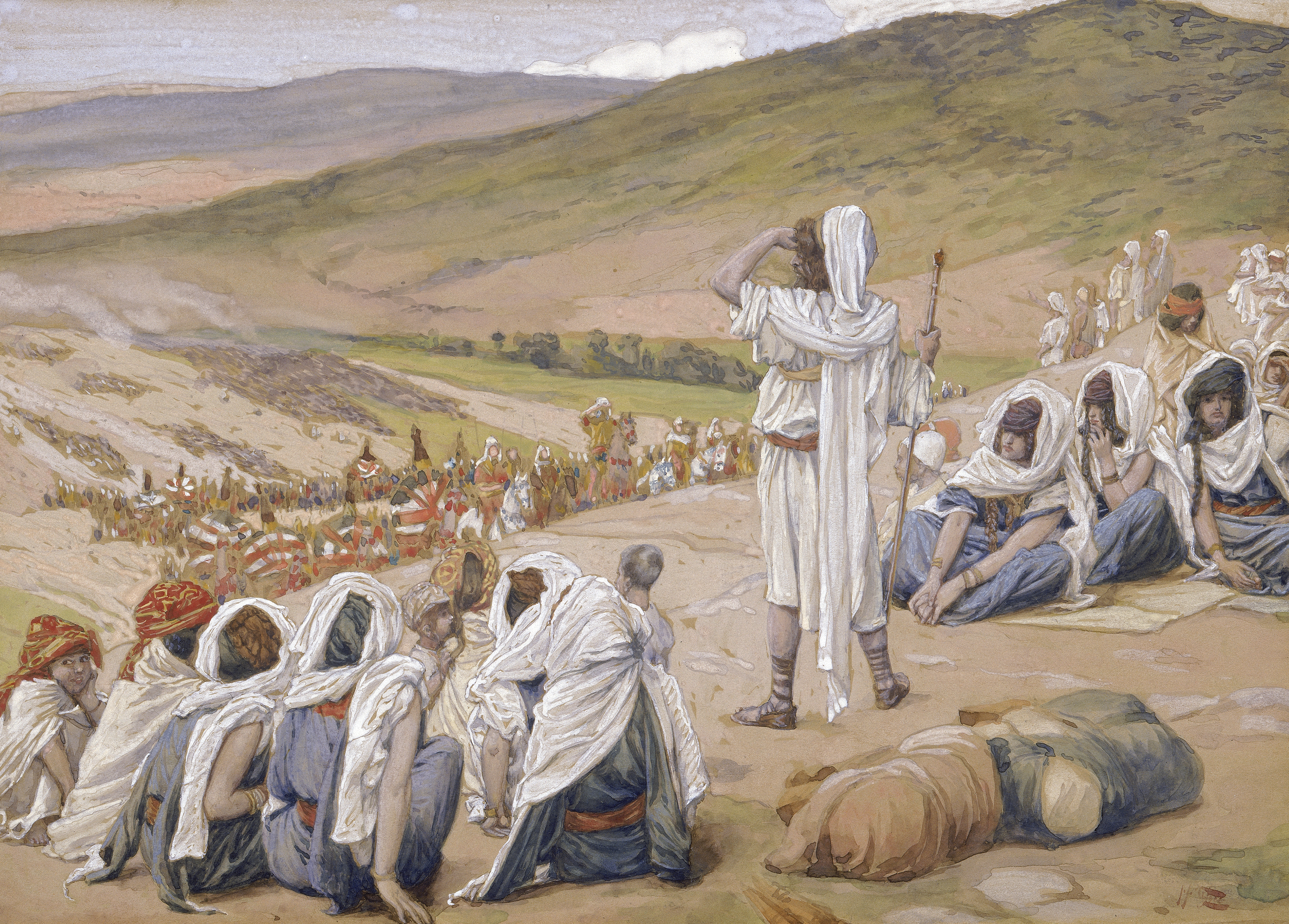
Jacob Sees Esau Coming to Meet Him (watercolor circa 1896–1902 by James Tissot)

The parashah has parallels or is discussed in these Biblical sources:

=== Genesis chapter 32 ===
The force of 400 men that Esau brought with him to meet Jacob in Genesis 32:7 exceeded the 318 men with whom Abraham defeated four kings and rescued Lot in Genesis 14:14–15.

In Genesis 32:13, Jacob reminded God that God had promised that Jacob's descendants would be as numerous as the sands. In Genesis 15:5, God promised that Abraham's descendants would be as numerous as the stars of heaven. In Genesis 22:17, God promised that Abraham's descendants would as numerous as the stars of heaven and the sands on the seashore. In Genesis 26:4, God reminded Isaac that God had promised Abraham that God would make his heirs as numerous as the stars. Similarly, in Exodus 32:13, Moses reminded God that God had promised to make the Patriarch's descendants as numerous as the stars. In Deuteronomy 1:10, Moses reported that God had multiplied the Israelites until they were then as numerous as the stars. In Deuteronomy 10:22, Moses reported that God had made the Israelites as numerous as the stars. And Deuteronomy 28:62 foretold that the Israelites would be reduced in number after having been as numerous as the stars.

Hosea 12:4–5, part of the haftarah for the parashah, interpreted Jacob's encounter with the angel. Hosea 12:4 says that Jacob by his strength strove with a godlike being. Hosea 12:5 says that Jacob strove with an angel and prevailed, and that Jacob wept and supplicated the angel. And Hosea 12:5 further says that at Bethel, Jacob found the angel and spoke with him there.

Just as in Genesis 32:30, Jacob asked his adversary to tell him his name, in Judges 13:17, Manoah asked the angel who visited him and his wife, "What is your name, so that when your words come to pass, we may do you honor?" And just as in Genesis 32:30, Jacob's adversary replied: "Why is it that you ask after my name?" in Judges 13:18, the angel replied to Manoah: "Why do you ask after my name, seeing it is hidden?"

=== Genesis chapter 33 ===
The 100 pieces of silver that Jacob paid the children of Hamor for the parcel of ground where he had spread his tent outside the city of Shechem in Genesis 33:18–19 compares with the 400 shekels of silver that Abraham paid Ephron the Hittite to buy the cave of Machpelah and adjoining land in Genesis 23:14–16; the 50 shekels of silver that King David paid Araunah the Jebusite for Araunah's threshing floor, oxen, and wood in 2 Samuel 24:18–24 (but 1 Chronicles 21:24 reports cost 600 shekels of gold); and the 17 shekels of silver that Jeremiah paid his cousin Hanamel for his field in Anathoth in the land of Benjamin in Jeremiah 23:7–9.

=== Genesis chapter 34 ===
Jacob appeared to recall Simeon and Levi’s violence in Genesis 34:25–29 when in Genesis 49:6 Jacob lamented Simeon and Levi’s murderous ways.

Jacob's complaint to Simeon and Levi in Genesis 34:30 that they had made Jacob odious among the inhabitants of the land was echoed by the complaint of the overseers of the Israelites to Moses in Exodus 5:21 that Moses had made them loathsome to Pharaoh and his courtiers.

=== Genesis chapter 35 ===
The report of Genesis 35:22 that Reuben lay with Bilhah, his father's concubine, and Israel heard of it, is echoed in Genesis 49:4, when Jacob recalled the incident and deprived Reuben of the blessing of the firstborn, because he went up on Jacob's bed and defiled it.

Joshua 14:15 reports that the former name of Hebron, Kiriath-arba, mentioned in Genesis 35:27, derived from the name of Arba, the greatest man among the Anakim.

== In early nonrabbinic interpretation ==
The parashah has parallels or is discussed in these early nonrabbinic sources:

=== Genesis chapter 32 ===
The 1st century CE Jewish Apocryphal book the Wisdom of Solomon told that Wisdom defended Jacob from his enemies, kept him safe from ambush, and in a hard conflict gave him victory, so that he might know that goodness is stronger than all else.

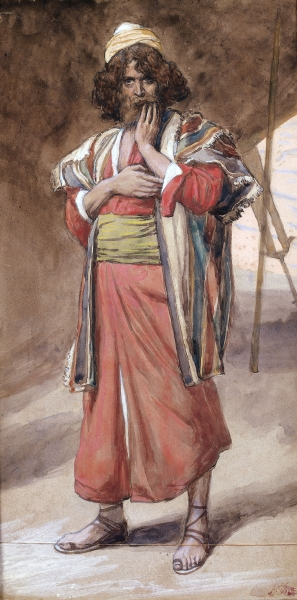
Jacob (watercolor circa 1896–1902 by James Tissot)

== In classical rabbinic interpretation ==
The parashah is discussed in these rabbinic sources from the era of the Mishnah and the Talmud:

=== Genesis chapter 32 ===
The Rabbis of the midrash questioned the wisdom of Jacob's decision to contact Esau in Genesis 32:4. Nahman ben Samuel compared the decision to waking a robber sleeping on a path to tell him of danger. The Rabbis envisioned that God asked Jacob: "Esau was going his own way, yet you sent to him?"

The Rabbis of the midrash deduced that the "messengers" of Genesis 32:4 were angels. The Rabbis reasoned that if (as the midrash taught) an angel escorted Eliezer, who was just a servant of the house, how much the more would angels have accompanied Jacob, who was the beloved of the house. Rabbi Hama ben Hanina reasoned that if five angels appeared to Hagar, who was just Sarah's handmaid, how much more would angels appear to Jacob. And Rabbi Jannai reasoned that if three angels met Joseph (counting the three uses of "man" in Genesis 37:15–17), and he was the youngest of the ancestors of the 12 tribes of Israel, how much more would angels meet Jacob, who was the father of all 12.

Judah haNasi once directed Rabbi Afes to write a letter in Judah's name to Emperor Antoninus. Rabbi Afes wrote: "From Judah the Prince to our Sovereign the Emperor Antoninus." Judah read the letter, tore it up, and wrote: "From your servant Judah to our Sovereign the Emperor Antoninus." Rabbi Afes remonstrated that Judah treated his honor too lightly. Judah replied that he was not better than his ancestor, who in Genesis 32:5 sent a message saying: "Thus says your servant Jacob."

Rabbi Jacob bar Idi pointed out a contradiction between God's promise to protect Jacob in Genesis 28:15 and Jacob's fear in Genesis 32:8; Rabbi Jacob explained that Jacob feared that some sin might cause him to lose the protection of God's promise.

Rabbi Eleazar taught that Obadiah hid 50 of 100 prophets of God in a cave in 1 Kings 18:4 because he learned the lesson of dividing his camp from Jacob's actions in Genesis 32:8–9. Rabbi Abbahu, however, said that it was because the cave could hold only 50.

Reading Jacob's beseeching God in Genesis 32:10, "O God of my father Abraham, and God of my father Isaac," a midrash asked whether Esau (from whom Jacob sought God's protection) could not have made the same claim for God's favor. The midrash taught that God affords God's protection to those who choose the Patriarchs' ways and act as they did, and not to those who do not. (Thus the midrash implied that Esau would not have been able to appeal for God's protection for his father's sake, for Esau had not emulated his father's deeds.)

Reading Genesis 32:11, "I am too small (קָטֹנְתִּי, katonti) for all the mercies, and of all the truth, that You have shown to Your servant," Rabbi Abba bar Kahana interpreted the word קָטֹנְתִּי, katonti, to mean "I do not deserve them" (the kindnesses that God had shown Jacob), for "I am too small." Rabbi Levi interpreted the word קָטֹנְתִּי, katonti, to mean that Jacob did indeed deserve those kindnesses, but now "I am too small" (for God had already rewarded the merit that Jacob once had, and thus diminished the favor to which his merit may have entitled him, so now he feared that he might have no right to appeal for God's further assistance).

Rabbi Yannai taught that when people expose themselves to danger and are saved by miracles, it is deducted from their merits and so they end up with less merit to their credit. Rabbi Hanin cited Genesis 32:11 to prove this, reading Jacob to say to God: "I am become diminished [that is, I have less merit to my credit] by reason of all the deeds of kindness and all the truth that You have shown to your servant."

Rabbi Eliezer taught that the five Hebrew letters of the Torah that alone among Hebrew letters have two separate shapes (depending whether they are in the middle or the end of a word)—צ פ נ מ כ (Kh, M, N, P, Z)—all relate to the mystery of the redemption. With the letter kaph (כ), God redeemed Abraham from Ur of the Chaldees, as in Genesis 12:1, God says, "Get you (לֶךְ-לְךָ, lekh lekha) out of your country, and from your kindred ... to the land that I will show you." With the letter mem (מ), Isaac was redeemed from the land of the Philistines, as in Genesis 26:16, the Philistine king Abimelech told Isaac, "Go from us: for you are much mightier (מִמֶּנּוּ, מְאֹד, mimenu m'od) than we." With the letter nun (נ), Jacob was redeemed from the hand of Esau, as in Genesis 32:12, Jacob prayed, "Deliver me, I pray (הַצִּילֵנִי נָא, hazileini na), from the hand of my brother, from the hand of Esau." With the letter peh (פ), God redeemed Israel from Egypt, as in Exodus 3:16–17, God told Moses, "I have surely visited you, (פָּקֹד פָּקַדְתִּי, pakod pakadeti) and (seen) that which is done to you in Egypt, and I have said, I will bring you up out of the affliction of Egypt." With the letter tsade (צ), God will redeem Israel from the oppression of the kingdoms, and God will say to Israel, I have caused a branch to spring forth for you, as Zechariah 6:12 says, "Behold, the man whose name is the Branch (צֶמַח, zemach); and he shall grow up (יִצְמָח, yizmach) out of his place, and he shall build the temple of the Lord." These letters were delivered to Abraham. Abraham delivered them to Isaac, Isaac delivered them to Jacob, Jacob delivered the mystery of the Redemption to Joseph, and Joseph delivered the secret of the Redemption to his brothers, as in Genesis 50:24, Joseph told his brothers, "God will surely visit (פָּקֹד יִפְקֹד, pakod yifkod) you." Jacob's son Asher delivered the mystery of the Redemption to his daughter Serah. When Moses and Aaron came to the elders of Israel and performed signs in their sight, the elders told Serah. She told them that there is no reality in signs. The elders told her that Moses said, "God will surely visit (פָּקֹד יִפְקֹד, pakod yifkod) you" (as in Genesis 50:24). Serah told the elders that Moses was the one who would redeem Israel from Egypt, for she heard (in the words of Exodus 3:16), "I have surely visited (פָּקֹד פָּקַדְתִּי, pakod pakadeti) you." The people immediately believed in God and Moses, as Exodus 4:31 says, "And the people believed, and when they heard that the Lord had visited the children of Israel."

A midrash interpreted the words of Genesis 32:13, "I will surely do you good (הֵיטֵב אֵיטִיב, heiteiv eitiv)," (in which the verb is doubled) to mean both "I will do you good for your own sake" and "I will do you good for the sake of your fathers."

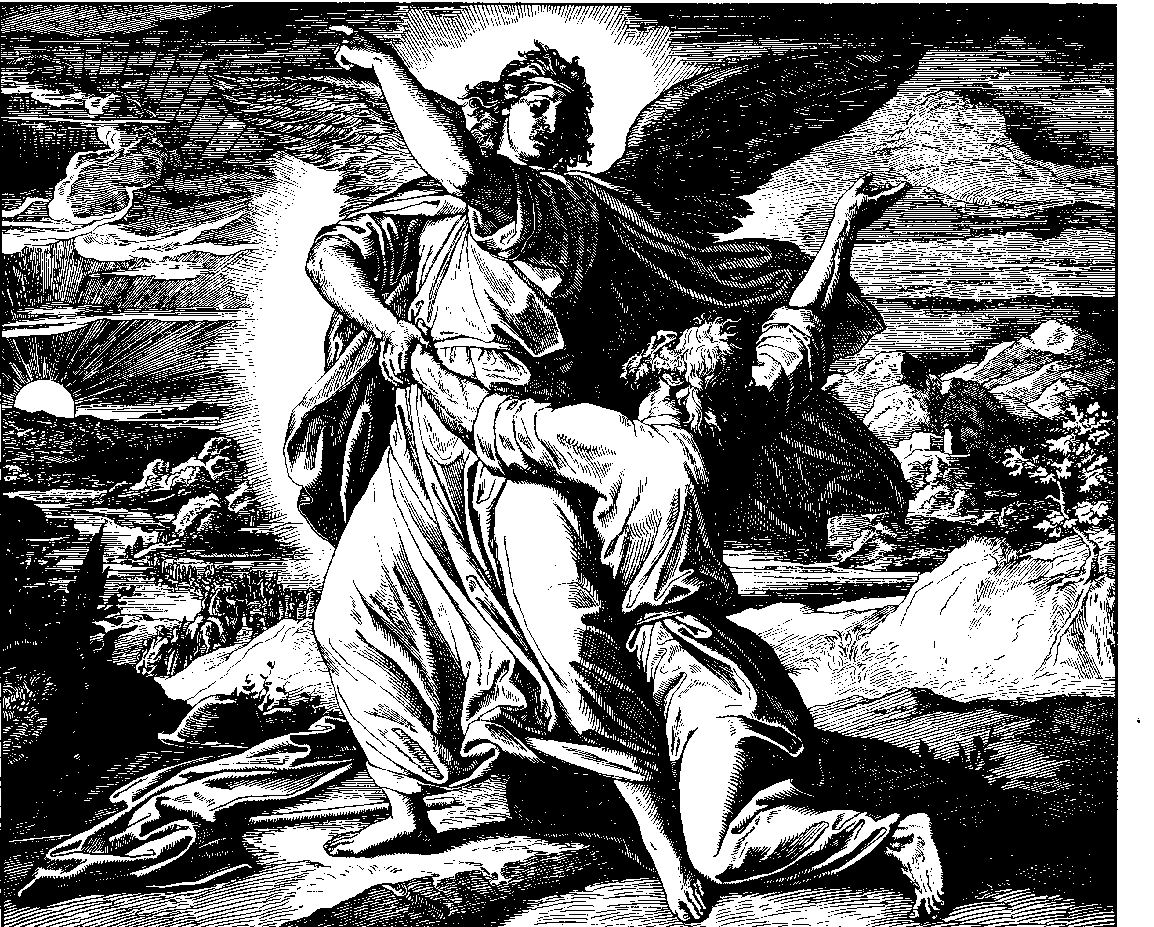
Jacob Wrestles with the Angel (woodcut by Julius Schnorr von Carolsfeld from the 1860 Die Bibel in Bildern)

Rabbi Hama ben Hanina taught that the "man" who wrestled with Jacob in Genesis 32:25 was Esau's guardian angel, and that Jacob alluded to this when he told Esau in Genesis 33:10, "Forasmuch as I have seen your face, as one sees the face of Elohim, and you were pleased with me."

Rabbi Samuel bar Nahmani taught that Jacob's adversary appeared to Jacob as an idol worshiper, and the Master has said in a Baraita that if an Israelite is joined by a heathen on the way, the Israelite should let the heathen walk on the right (so that the Israelite can keep the right hand nearest to the idol worshiper, so as to more easily defend against a sudden attack. Jacob must have done so, as his attacker injured the thigh that was nearest to him, the right thigh). Rav Samuel bar Aha said in the name of Rava bar Ulla in the presence of Rav Papa that the attacker appeared to Jacob as one of the wise, and the Master (Rav Judah) said whoever walks at the right hand of his teacher is uncultured. (According to this view, Jacob regarded the other as a scholar and took his place at the other's left hand and so was injured in his right thigh, the side nearest to the other.) And the Rabbis said that he came from behind and dislocated both of Jacob's thighs. The Rabbis interpret Genesis 32:25, "As he wrestled with him," like Rabbi Joshua ben Levi, who said Genesis 32:25 teaches that the combatants threw up the dust of their feet to the Throne of Glory, for Genesis 32:25 says, "As he wrestled (בְּהֵאָבְקוֹ, behe'avko) with him," and Nahum 1:3 says, "And, the clouds are the dust (אֲבַק, avak) of his feet."

Reading Genesis 32:25, "And there wrestled a man with him until the breaking of the day," Rabbi Isaac deduced that a scholar should not go out alone at night (for the man assaulted Jacob only during the night, and departed with the break of day).

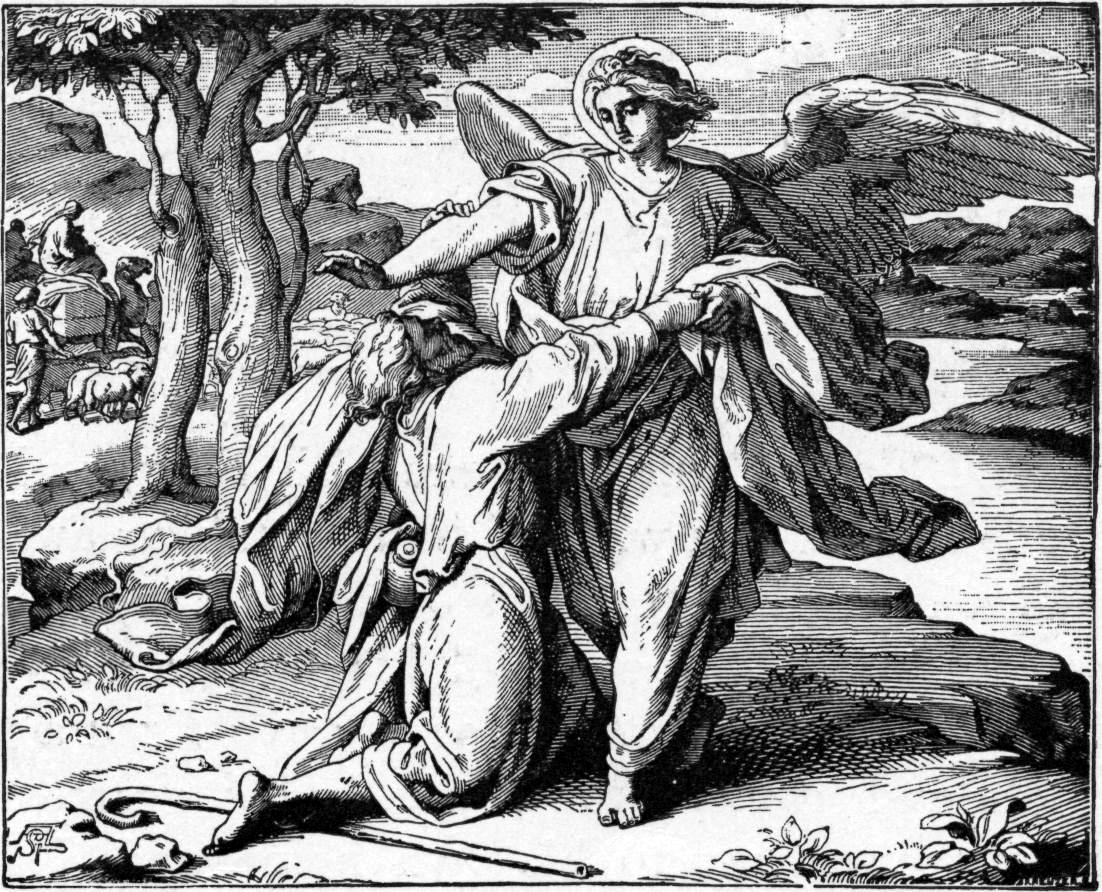
God has sent an angel to Jacob. (illustration from the 1897 Bible Pictures and What They Teach Us by Charles Foster)

A midrash taught that an angel attacked Jacob in Genesis 32:25 because Jacob had failed to fulfill his vow to God. The Rabbis taught that Providence examines one's record of deeds on three occasions: (1) if one goes on a journey alone, (2) if one sits in an unstable house, and (3) if one vows and does not fulfill one's vow. The midrash taught that we know about the problem of vowing and not paying from Deuteronomy 23:22, "When you vow a vow to the Lord your God, you shalt not be slack to pay it"; and from Proverbs 20:25, "It is a snare to a man rashly to say, 'Holy,' and after vows to make inquiry." If one delays paying one's vow, Providence examines one's record, and the angels assume a prosecutorial stance, and scrutinize one's sins. The midrash illustrated this by noting that when Jacob left Canaan for to Aram-Naharaim, Genesis 28:20 reports, "Jacob made a vow." Then he became wealthy, returned, and did not pay his vow. So God brought Esau against him, bent on killing Jacob, and Esau took a huge gift from him of the 200 goats and other gifts reported in Genesis 32:15, yet Jacob did not fulfill his vow. So God brought the angel against him, and the angel wrestled with Jacob but did not kill him, as Genesis 32:25 reports, "Jacob was left alone. And a man wrestled with him until the break of dawn." The midrash taught that it was Samael, Esau's guardian angel, who wanted to kill him, as Genesis 32:26 reports, "He saw that he could not prevail against him." But Jacob left disabled. And when Jacob still did not pay his vow, the trouble with Dinah came upon him, as reported in Genesis 34. When Jacob still did not pay his vow, as Genesis 35:19 reports, "Rachel died and was buried." Then God asked how long Jacob would take punishment and not pay attention to the sin for which he suffered. So God told Jacob to go to Bethel, make an altar there, at the very place where Jacob vowed to God.

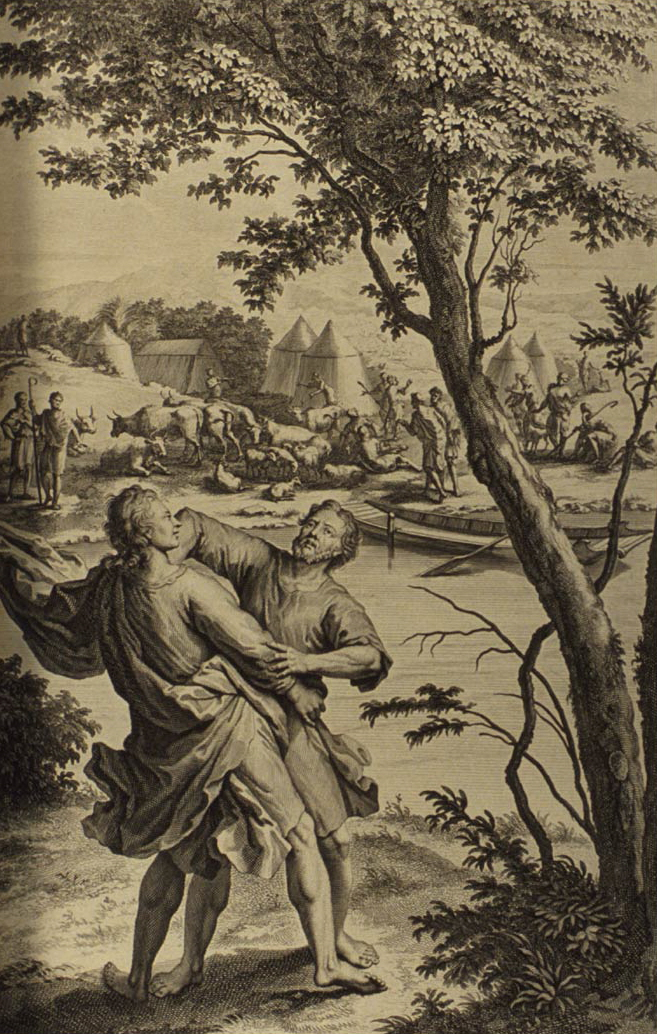
Jacob wrestles with an Angel (illustration from the 1728 Figures de la Bible)

Similarly, the Pirke De-Rabbi Eliezer taught that Jacob wished to ford the Jabbok and was detained there by an angel, who asked Jacob whether Jacob had not told God (in Genesis 28:22), "Of all that you shall give me I will surely give a tenth to You." So Jacob gave a tenth of all the cattle that he had brought from Paddan-Aram. Jacob had brought some 5,500 animals, so his tithe came to 550 animals. Jacob again tried to ford the Jabbok but was hindered again. The angel once again asked Jacob whether Jacob had not told God (in Genesis 28:22), "Of all that you shall give me I will surely give a tenth to You." The angel noted that Jacob had sons and that Jacob had not given a tithe of them. So Jacob set aside the four firstborn sons (whom the law excluded from the tithe) of each of the four mothers, and eight sons remained. He began to count from Simeon, and included Benjamin, and continued the count from the beginning. And so Levi was reckoned as the tenth son, and thus the tithe, holy to God, as Leviticus 27:32 says, "The tenth shall be holy to the Lord." So the angel Michael descended and took Levi and brought him up before the Throne of Glory and told God that Levi was God's lot. And God blessed him, that the sons of Levi should minister on earth before God (as directed in Deuteronomy 10:8) like the ministering angels in heaven.

A midrash read Genesis 32:25, "And there wrestled a man with him until the breaking of the day," to refer to the breaking of the day for Israel, for exile was like night. The midrash taught that the nations of the world and the kingdom of Edom (symbolizing the Roman Empire) wrestled with Israel to lead Israel astray from God's path. And as Genesis 32:26 reports, "And when he saw that he could not prevail against him," that is, that he could not dissuade Israel from acknowledging God's unity, then (in the words of Genesis 32:26) "he touched the hollow of his thigh," that is, Jacob's circumcision. Thus, the Roman government (symbolized by Edom) forbade circumcision of Jewish children. And thus Genesis 32:26 continues, "And the hollow of Jacob's thigh was out of joint," referred to those defiled during those days of persecution.

Reading Genesis 32:27, "And he said: 'Let me go, for the day breaks,'" the Gemara told that Jacob asked his adversary whether he was a thief or a rogue that he was afraid of the morning. He replied that he was an angel, and from the day that he was created, he had not yet had his time to sing praises to God, until that moment. The Gemara noted that this statement implying that angels sing God praises at an appointed time supported the statement of Rav Hananel in the name of Rav, who said that three divisions of ministering angels sing praises to God every day. One proclaims (in the words of Isaiah 6:3), "Holy"; the second proclaims, "Holy"; and the third proclaims, "Holy is the Lord of hosts."

Reading the words of Genesis 32:29, "Your name shall be called no more Jacob, but Israel," the Tanna Devei Eliyahu taught that one should read "Israel" as ish ra'ah El, "a man who sees God," for all of Jacob's actions were directed to God.

Reading Hosea 12:5, "Yea, he strove with an angel, and prevailed; he wept, and made supplication to him," the Gemara commented that this verse did not make clear who prevailed over whom. But Genesis 32:29, "For you have striven with God and with men and have prevailed," made clear that Jacob mastered the angel. Hosea 12:5, "He wept and made supplication to him," does not make clear who wept to whom. But the angel's words in Genesis 32:27, "And he said: 'Let me go,'" made clear that the angel wept to Jacob. Reading Genesis 32:29, "For you have striven with God and with men," Rabbah taught that the angel intimated to Jacob that two princes were destined to come from him: the Exilarch in Babylon and the Prince in the Land of Israel. The angel thus hinted to Jacob of the coming exile of the Jewish people.

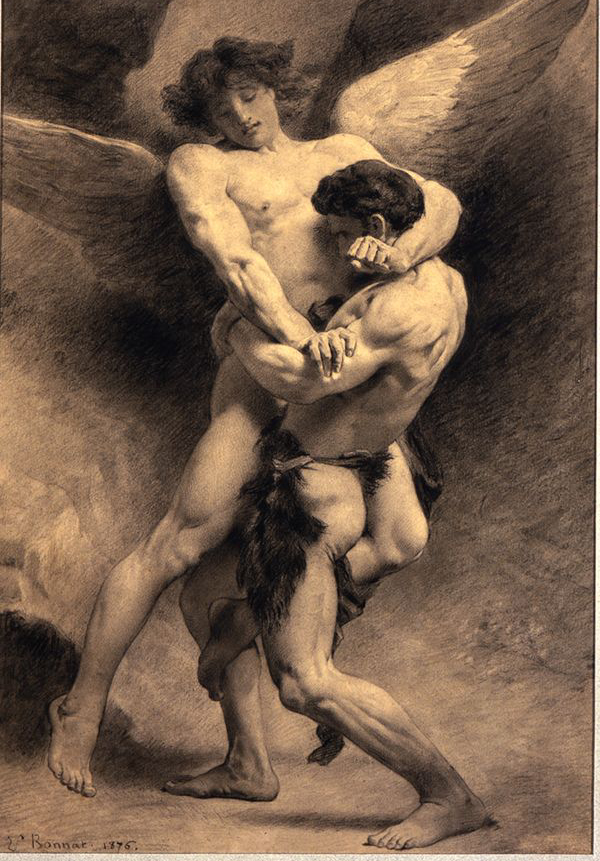
Jacob Wrestling with the Angel (1876 painting by Léon Bonnat)

Chapter 7 of Tractate Chullin in the Mishnah, Tosefta, and Babylonian Talmud interpreted the laws of the prohibition of the sinew of the hip (the sciatic nerve, gid ha-nasheh) in Genesis 32:33. The Mishnah taught that the prohibition against eating the sciatic nerve in Genesis 32:33 is in force both within the Land of Israel and outside it, both during the existence of the Temple and after it, and with respect to both consecrated and unconsecrated animals. It applies to both domesticated and wild animals, and to both the right and the left hip. But it does not apply to birds, because they have no spoon-shaped hip as the muscles upon the hip bone (femur) of a bird lie flat and are not raised and convex like those of cattle. It also applies to a live fetus found in a slaughtered animal, although Rabbi Judah said that it does not apply to a fetus. And the live fetus' fat is permitted. Rabbi Meir taught that one should not trust butchers to remove the sciatic nerve, but the Sages taught that one may trust butchers to remove the sciatic nerve as well as the fat that Leviticus 3:17 and 7:23 forbids.

A midrash interpreted Psalm 146:7, "The Lord lets loose the prisoners," to read, "The Lord permits the forbidden," and thus to teach that what God forbade in one case, God permitted in another. God forbade consuming the sciatic nerve in animals (in Genesis 32:33) but permitted it in fowl. God forbade the abdominal fat of cattle (in Leviticus 3:3) but permitted it in the case of beasts. God forbade eating meat without ritual slaughter (in Leviticus 17:1–4) but permitted it for fish. Similarly, Rabbi Abba and Rabbi Jonathan in the name of Rabbi Levi taught that God permitted more things than God forbade. For example, God counterbalanced the prohibition of pork (in Leviticus 11:7 and Deuteronomy 14:7–8) by permitting mullet (which some say tastes like pork).

The Mishnah taught that one may send a thigh that still contains the sciatic nerve to a Gentile. But Abahu taught that the Mishnah allowed a Jew to benefit only from the sciatic nerve of an animal that was not slaughtered according to the procedure prescribed by the Torah.

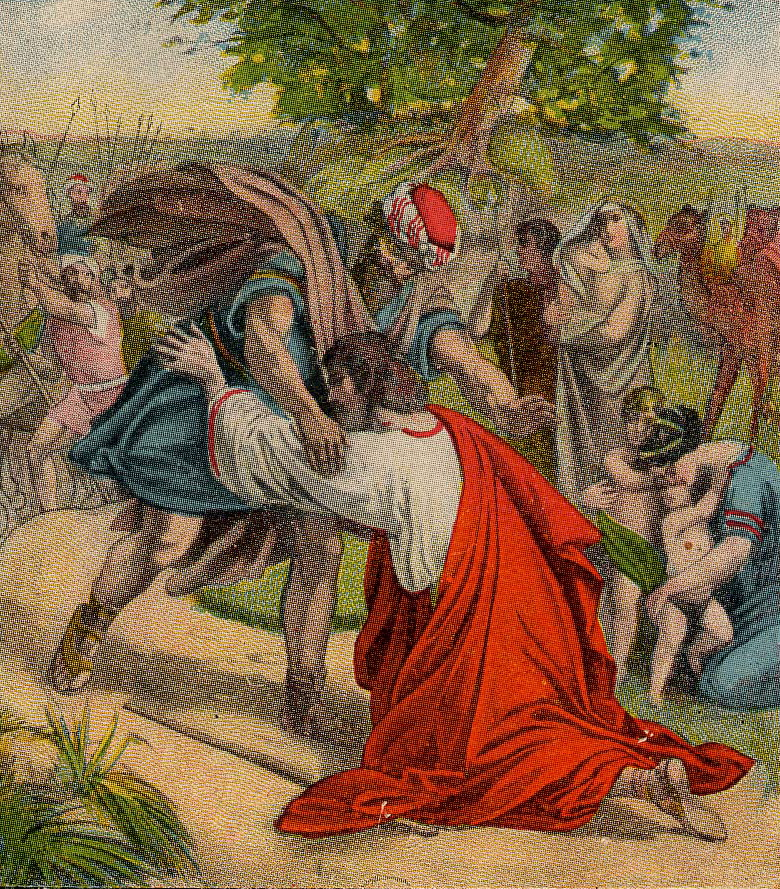
The Reconciliation of Jacob and Esau (illustration from a Bible card published 1907 by the Providence Lithograph Company)

=== Genesis chapter 33 ===
A midrash noted that dots appear above the word "and kissed him" (וַיִּשָּׁקֵהוּ, vayishakeihu) in Genesis 33:4. Rabbi Simeon ben Eleazar taught that wherever one finds the plain writing exceeding the dotted letters, one must interpret the plain writing. But if the dotted letters exceed the plain writing, one must interpret the dotted letters. In Genesis 33:4, the plain writing equals in number the dotted letters, so Rabbi Simeon ben Eleazar taught that Genesis 33:4 conveys that Esau kissed Jacob with all his heart. Rabbi Jannai replied that if this were so, there would be no reason for dots to appear over the word. Rabbi Jannai taught that the dots mean that Esau wished to bite Jacob, but that Jacob's neck turned to marble, and Esau's teeth were blunted and loosened. Hence the words "and they wept" in Genesis 33:4 reflect that Jacob wept because of his neck and Esau wept because of his teeth. Rabbi Abbahu in Rabbi Johanan's name adduced support for that conclusion from Song of Songs 7:5, which says: "Your neck is as a tower of ivory."

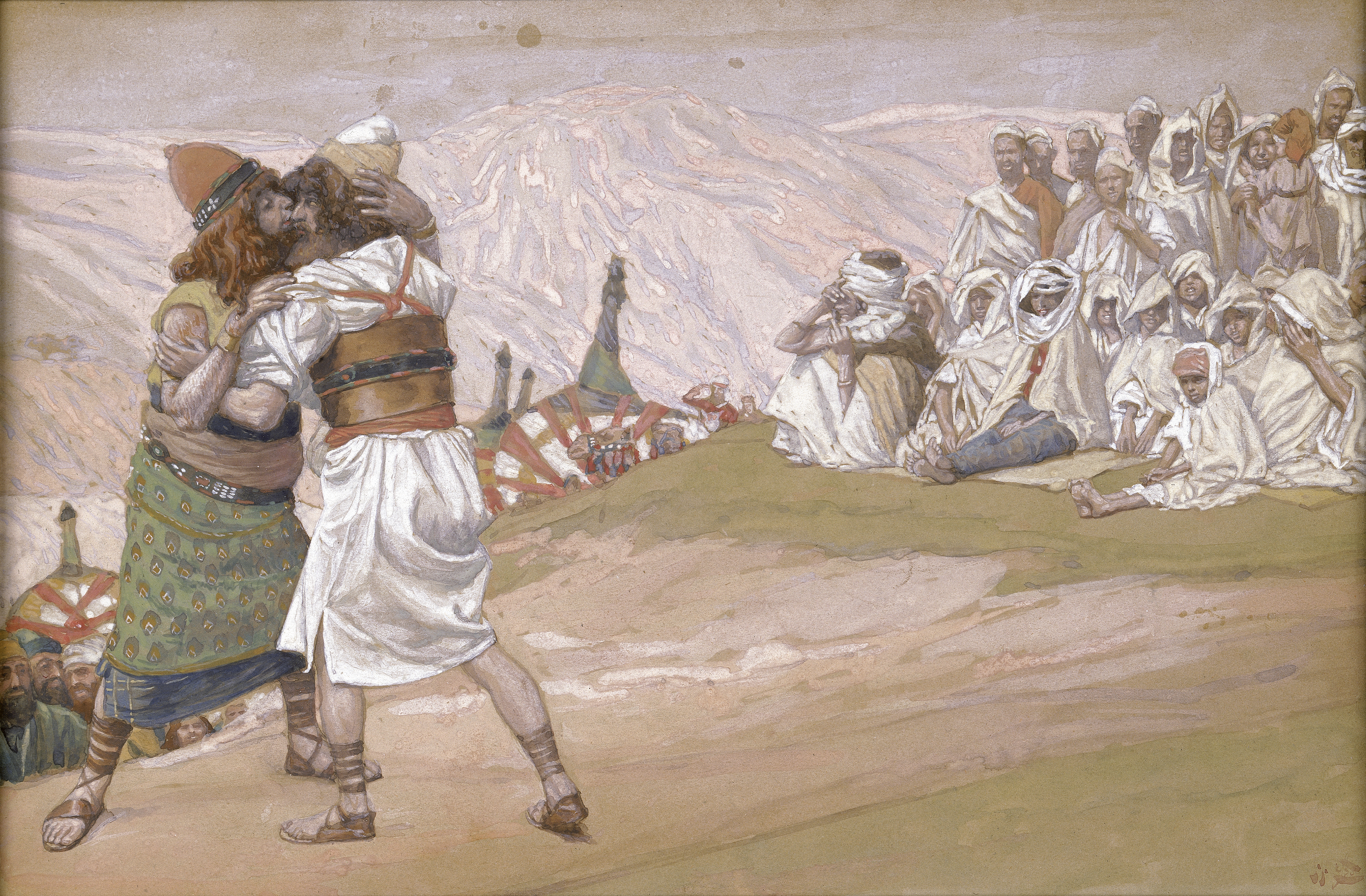
The Meeting of Esau and Jacob (watercolor circa 1896–1902 by James Tissot)

Rabbi Tarfon taught that God came from Mount Sinai (or others say Mount Seir) and was revealed to the children of Esau, as Deuteronomy 33:2 says, "The Lord came from Sinai, and rose from Seir to them," and Seir means the children of Esau, as Genesis 36:8 says, "And Esau dwelt in Mount Seir." God asked them whether they would accept the Torah, and they asked what was written in it. God answered that it included (in Exodus 20:13 and Deuteronomy 5:17), "You shall do no murder." The children of Esau replied that they were unable to abandon the blessing with which Isaac blessed Esau in Genesis 27:40, "By your sword shall you live." From there, God turned and was revealed to the children of Ishmael, as Deuteronomy 33:2 says, "He shined forth from Mount Paran," and Paran means the children of Ishmael, as Genesis 21:21 says of Ishmael, "And he dwelt in the wilderness of Paran." God asked them whether they would accept the Torah, and they asked what was written in it. God answered that it included (in Exodus 20:13 and Deuteronomy 5:17), "You shall not steal." The children of Ishmael replied that they were unable to abandon their fathers' custom, as Joseph said in Genesis 40:15 (referring to the Ishmaelites' transaction reported in Genesis 37:28), "For indeed I was stolen away out of the land of the Hebrews." From there, God sent messengers to all the nations of the world asking them whether they would accept the Torah, and they asked what was written in it. God answered that it included (in Exodus 20:3 and Deuteronomy 5:7), "You shall have no other gods before me." They replied that they had no delight in the Torah, therefore let God give it to God's people, as Psalm 29:11 says, "The Lord will give strength [identified with the Torah] to His people; the Lord will bless His people with peace." From there, God returned and was revealed to the children of Israel, as Deuteronomy 33:2 says, "And he came from the ten thousands of holy ones," and the expression "ten thousands" means the children of Israel, as Numbers 10:36 says, "And when it rested, he said, 'Return, O Lord, to the ten thousands of the thousands of Israel.'" With God were thousands of chariots and 20,000 angels, and God's right hand held the Torah, as Deuteronomy 33:2 says, "At his right hand was a fiery law to them."

Rabbi Haninah taught that Esau paid great attention to his parent (horo), his father, whom he supplied with meals, as Genesis 25:28 reports, "Isaac loved Esau, because he ate of his venison." Rabbi Samuel the son of Rabbi Gedaliah concluded that God decided to reward Esau for this. When Jacob offered Esau gifts, Esau answered Jacob in Genesis 33:9, "I have enough (רָב, rav); do not trouble yourself." So God declared that with the same expression that Esau thus paid respect to Jacob, God would command Jacob's descendants not to trouble Esau's descendants, and thus God told the Israelites in Deuteronomy 2:3, "You have circled this mountain (הָר, har) long enough (רַב, rav)."

The Gemara cited the accounts of Genesis 28:13 and 33:9 to demonstrate Jacob's trust in God. The Gemara taught that God punished Moses for complaining to God in Exodus 5:23, "Since I came to Pharaoh to speak in Your name, he has done evil to this people, neither have You delivered Your people at all." The Gemara told that God replied to Moses by lamenting that the Patriarchs were gone, as several times God had revealed God's Self to Abraham, Isaac, and Jacob as God Almighty (El Shaddai), and they did not question God's ways as Moses had. Regarding Jacob, in Genesis 28:13, God told Jacob, "The land upon which you lie, to you I will give it," but Jacob sought a place to pitch his tent and did not find one until (as Genesis 33:19) he purchased it for one hundred coins, and still Jacob did not question God's ways.

The Rabbis of the Gemara discussed Jacob's extreme flattery in Genesis 33:10, where Jacob compares seeing Esau's face to seeing God's face. Rabbi Judah of the Land of Israel (and some say Rabbi Simon ben Pazi) taught that one may flatter wicked people, as Isaiah 32:5 says that in the World To Come, "The vile person shall no longer be called generous, nor shall the churl be said to be noble," and this implies that in this world, one may flatter them. Rabbi Shimon ben Lakish (Resh Lakish) taught that this can be proven from Jacob's flattery of Esau in Genesis 33:10. The Gemara noted that Rabbi Shimon ben Lakish thus disagreed with Rabbi Levi, who compared the interaction between Jacob and Esau to a host who invited a guest to a meal, and the guest realized that the host wanted to kill the guest. The guest told the host that the dish that the host served tasted like a dish that the guest had tasted in the king's house, so that the host might think that the king must know the guest and be afraid to kill the guest. Thus, when Jacob told Esau that his face was like a divine face, Jacob intended to let Esau know that he had seen angels, to make Esau afraid to harm him. But Rabbi Elazar said that anyone who flatters brings wrath to the world, as Job 36:13 says, "But those with flattery in their hearts bring about wrath," and the prayer of the flatterer is not heard, as Job 36:13 also says, "They do not cry for help when He binds them."

The Gemara read the words of Genesis 33:11, "Because I have everything," to support the Sages' teaching that God gave three people in this world a taste of the World To Come—Abraham, Isaac, and Jacob. Of Abraham, Genesis 24:1 says, "And the Lord blessed Abraham with everything." Of Isaac, Genesis 27:33 says, "And I have eaten from everything." Already in their lifetimes they merited everything, that is perfection. The Gemara read these three verses also to teach that Abraham, Isaac, and Jacob were three people over whom the evil inclination had no sway, as Scripture says about them, respectively, "with everything," "from everything," and "everything," and the completeness of their blessings meant that they did not have to contend with their evil inclinations. And the Gemara read these same three verses to teach that Abraham, Isaac, and Jacob were three of six people over whom the Angel of Death had no sway in their demise—Abraham, Isaac, Jacob, Moses, Aaron, and Miriam. As Abraham, Isaac, and Jacob were blessed with everything, the Gemara reasoned, they were certainly spared the anguish of the Angel of Death.

A Baraita taught that if an idol worshiper asks a Jew where the Jew is going, the Jew should tell the idolater that the Jew is heading towards a place beyond the Jew's actual destination, as Jacob told the wicked Esau. For in Genesis 33:14, Jacob told Esau, "Until I come to my lord to Seir," while Genesis 33:17 records, "And Jacob journeyed to Succot." Reading the account in Genesis 33:14, Rabbi Abbahu said that he searched the whole Scriptures and did not find that Jacob ever went to Esau at Seir. Rabbi Abbahu asked whether it was then possible that Jacob, the truthful, could have deceived Esau. Rabbi Abbahu concluded that Jacob would indeed come to Esau, in the Messianic era, as Obadiah 1:21 reports, "And saviors shall come up on Mount Zion to judge the mount of Esau."

Rabbi Judan the son of Rabbi Simon cited Joseph's Tomb as one of three places where Scripture reports purchases in the Land of Israel, thus providing a defense against the nations of the world who might taunt the Jews, saying that the Israelites had stolen the Land. The three instances are: the cave of Machpelah, of which Genesis 23:16 reports, "And Abraham weighed to Ephron the silver"; Joseph's Tomb, of which Genesis 33:19 reports, "And he bought the parcel of ground"; and the Temple, of which 1 Chronicles 21:25 reports, "So David gave to Ornan for the place six hundred shekels of gold."

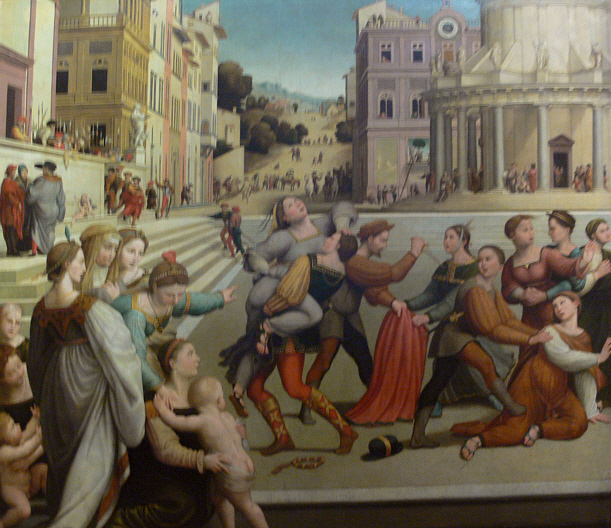
The Rape of Dinah (16th-century painting by Giuliano Bugiardini, at the Kunsthistorisches Museum in Vienna)

=== Genesis chapter 34 ===
The Pirke De-Rabbi Eliezer expounded on "the daughters of the land" whom Genesis 34:1 reports Dinah went out to see. The Pirke De-Rabbi Eliezer taught that because Dinah abode in the tents and did not go into the street, Shechem brought dancing girls playing on pipes into the streets to entice Dinah out. When Dinah went to see why the girls were making merry, Shechem seized her.

A Tanna taught in Rabbi Jose's name that Shechem was a place predestined for evil, for in Shechem Dinah was raped (as reported in Genesis 34:2), Joseph's brothers sold him (as reported in Genesis 37:17, Dothan being near Shechem), and the united kingdom of Israel and Judah was divided (as reported in 1 Kings 12:1).

In Genesis 34:3, the heart is enticed. A midrash catalogued the wide range of additional capabilities of the heart reported in the Hebrew Bible. The heart speaks, sees, hears, walks, falls, stands, rejoices, cries, is comforted, is troubled, becomes hardened, grows faint, grieves, fears, can be broken, becomes proud, rebels, invents, cavils, overflows, devises, desires, goes astray, lusts, is refreshed, can be stolen, is humbled, errs, trembles, is awakened, loves, hates, envies, is searched, is rent, meditates, is like a fire, is like a stone, turns in repentance, becomes hot, dies, melts, takes in words, is susceptible to fear, gives thanks, covets, becomes hard, makes merry, acts deceitfully, speaks from out of itself, loves bribes, writes words, plans, receives commandments, acts with pride, makes arrangements, and aggrandizes itself.

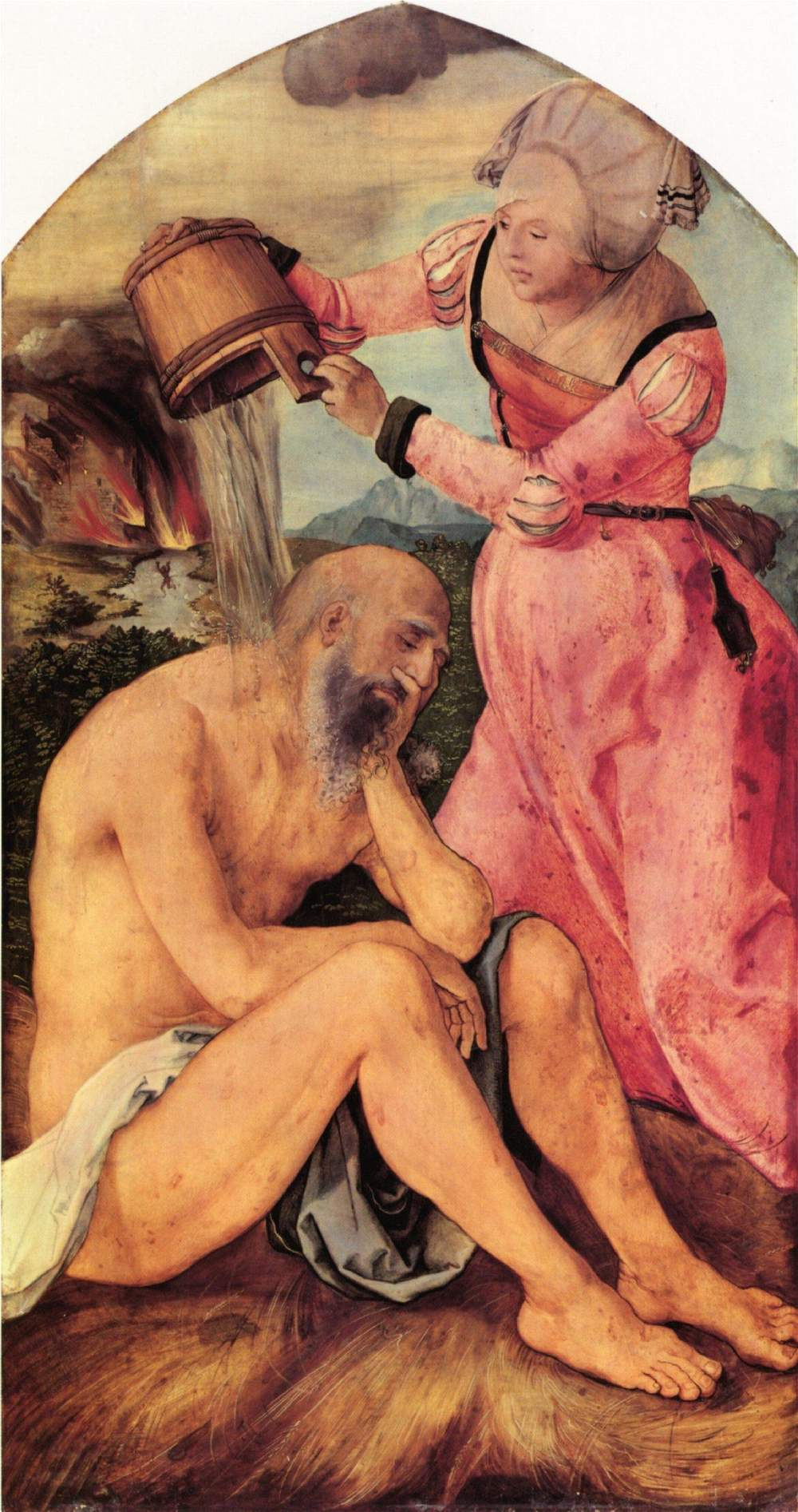
Job and His Wife (painting circa 1500–1503 by Albrecht Dürer)

A Baraita reported that some said that Job lived in the time of Jacob and married Dinah, finding the connection in the use of the same word with regard to Job's wife in Job 2:10, "You speak as one of the impious women (נְּבָלוֹת, nebalot) speaks," and with regard to Dinah in Genesis 34:7, "Because he had committed a vile deed (נְבָלָה, nebalah) in Israel."

The Mishnah deduced from Genesis 34:25 that the wound from a circumcision is still serious enough on the third day that one bathes a circumcised baby on that day even if it is the Sabbath.

Reading the words of Genesis 34:30, "And Jacob said to Simeon and Levi: 'You have troubled (עֲכַרְתֶּם, achartem) me,'" the Rabbis paraphrased: "The vat was clear, and you have muddied (עֲכַרְתֶּם, achartem) it."

A midrash read Judah's questions in Genesis 44:16, "What shall we speak or how shall we clear ourselves?" to hint to a series of sins. Judah asked, "What shall we say to my lord," with respect to the money that they retained after the first sale, the money that they retained after the second sale, the cup found in Benjamin's belongings, the treatment of Dinah in Genesis 34, the treatment of Bilhah in Genesis 35:22, the treatment of Tamar in Genesis 38, the sale of Joseph, allowing Simeon to remain in custody, and the peril to Benjamin.

=== Genesis chapter 35 ===
Rabbi Judan said that Jacob declared that Isaac blessed him with five blessings, and God correspondingly appeared five times to Jacob and blessed him (in Genesis 28:13–15, 31:3, 31:11–13, 35:1, and 35:9–12). And thus, in Genesis 46:1, Jacob "offered sacrifices to the God of his father Isaac," and not to the God of Abraham and Isaac. Rabbi Judan also said that Jacob wanted to thank God for permitting Jacob to see the fulfillment of those blessings. And the blessing that was fulfilled was that of Genesis 27:29, "Let people serve you, and nations bow down to you," which was fulfilled with regard to Joseph. (And thus Jacob mentioned Isaac then on going down to witness Joseph's greatness.)

A midrash taught that wherever there is idolatry, the Divine Presence (Shechinah) will not dwell there. Once, however, people remove idolatry, the Divine Presence can appear. For as soon as Jacob removed all idolatry from his camp, as Genesis 35:2 reports, "Then Jacob said to his household . . . 'Put away the strange gods that are among you,'" the Divine Presence immediately appeared to him, as Genesis 35:9 states, "God appeared again to Jacob."

Rabbi Samuel bar Nahman interpreted the report of Genesis 35:8 that "Deborah, Rebekah's nurse died, and she was buried below Beth-el under the oak; and the name of it was called Allon-bacuth (אַלּוֹן בָּכוּת)." Rabbi Samuel bar Nahman taught that the name Allon-bacuth was Greek, in which allon means 'another' (and thus the phrase could be read, "The name of it was called 'another weeping'"). Rabbi Samuel bar Nahman deduced from this that while Jacob was mourning for Deborah, word reached him that his mother Rebekah had died. And thus Genesis 35:9 reports, "and God appeared to Jacob again . . . and blessed him." Rabbi Aha taught in Rabbi Jonathan's name that the blessing with which God blessed Jacob in Genesis 35:9 was the mourners' blessing of consolation and comfort.

Similarly, the Rabbis taught that when Rebekah died, her bier was not taken out in public because of Esau. When Rebekah died, the people asked who would go out in front of her body, for Abraham had died, Isaac sat at home unable to see, Jacob had gone to Paddan Aram, and if Esau went out in front of her, people would curse her for raising such a person as Esau. So they took her bier out at night. Rabbi Jose bar Hanina taught that because they took her bier out at night, Scripture does not openly describe her death, but only alludes to it in Genesis 35:8. Rabbi Jose bar Hanina read Genesis 35:8 to say, "Deborah, Rebekah's nurse died, . . . and he called it the Weeping Oak," for they wept twice, for while Jacob was mourning for Deborah, the news of Rebekah's death reached him. And thus Genesis 35:9 reports, "and God appeared to Jacob again . . . and blessed him," because God blessed Jacob with the mourners' blessing.

A midrash interpreted Psalm 112:4, "To the upright He shines as a light in the darkness," to apply to the Patriarchs, "the upright," who saw the Divine Presence (Shechinah) face to face (so to speak). The midrash taught that we know this about Jacob from Genesis 35:9, which says, "God appeared to Jacob . . . and blessed him."

The Tanna Devei Eliyahu taught that when God found Jacob declaring what was true, that God is God, and acknowledging this truth in his own heart, God revealed God's Self to him at once, as Genesis 35:9 reports, "God appeared to Jacob again, when he came from Paddan-aram, and blessed him." The Tanna Devei Eliyahu taught that this was an application of Ezekiel 16:8, "behold, your time was the time of love" (that was promised to those who proved their love for God).

Reading the beginning of Genesis 35:9 as, "And God yet (עוֹד, od) appeared to Jacob," a midrash taught that the word yet (עוֹד, od) signified that God would never again unite God's Name with another person. God is the God of Abraham, the God of Isaac, and the God of Jacob only.

Reading the beginning of Genesis 35:9, "And God appeared to Jacob again (עוֹד, od)," Rabbi Jose bar Rabbi Hanina taught that again implies that God appeared this time as on the first occasion in Genesis 28:12–15. As on the first occasion, God spoke to Jacob through an angel, so on this occasion, it was through an angel. Alternatively, Rabbi Judan taught that the word again intimated that God would once again reveal God's self to Jacob, at Beersheba, on Jacob's descent into Egypt, in Genesis 46:1–4.

Reading Leviticus 9:4, "And an ox and a ram for peace offerings . . . for today the Lord appears to you," Rabbi Levi taught that God reasoned that if God would appear to and bless a Priest who offered a ram in God's name, how much more should God appear to and bless Jacob, whose features are engraved on God's throne. Thus Genesis 35:9 says, "And God appeared to Jacob again, when he came from Paddan-aram, and blessed him."

Bar Kappara taught that whoever calls Abraham "Abram" violates a positive command. Rabbi Levi said that such a person violates both a positive and a negative command, as Genesis 17:5 says: "Neither shall your name any more be called Abram"—that is a negative command—and Genesis 17:5 also says: "But your name shall be called Abraham"—that is a positive command. The midrash asked by analogy if one calls Israel "Jacob" does one infringe a positive command? The midrash answered that one does not, for it was taught that it was not intended that the name of Jacob should disappear, but that "Israel" should be his principal name and "Jacob" be his secondary name. Rabbi Zechariah interpreted it in Rabbi Aha's name as follows: In any event (in the words of Genesis 35:10), "Your name is Jacob," except that, "But Israel [too] shall be your name." Thus Jacob would be his principal name and "Israel" was added to it.

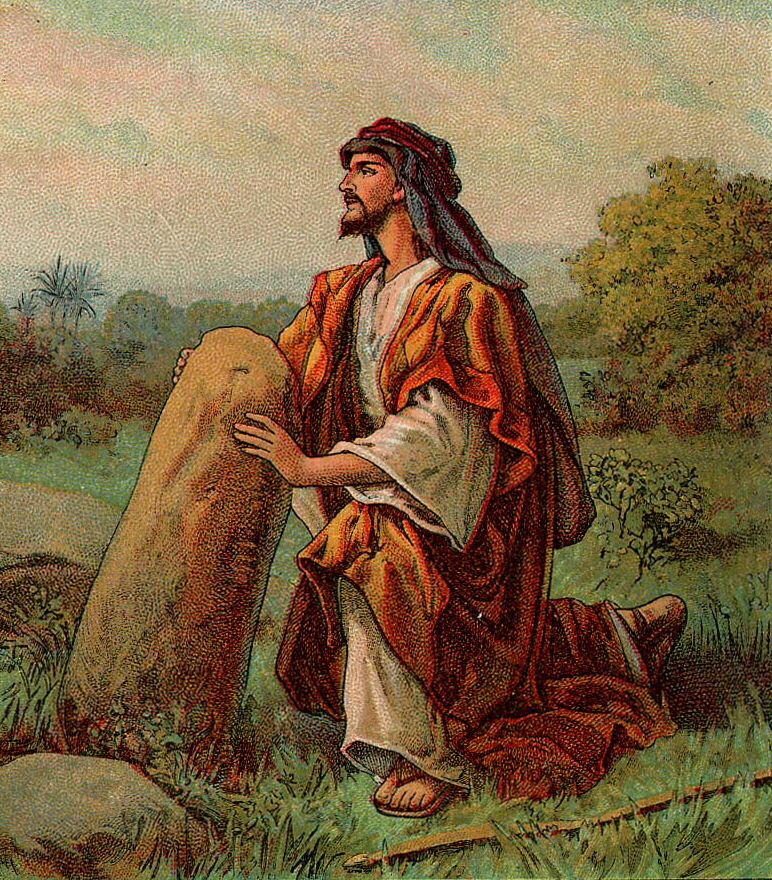
Jacob's Vision and God's Promise (illustration from a Bible card published 1906 by the Providence Lithograph Company)

Reading the words of Genesis 35:10, "but Israel shall be your name," the Tanna Devei Eliyahu taught that one should read not "Israel," but ish ra'ah El, "the man who saw God"; for all his actions were concentrated before him.

Resh Lakish taught that the words "I am God Almighty" (אֵל שַׁדַּי, El Shaddai) in Genesis 35:11 mean, "I am He Who said to the world: 'Enough!'" (דַּי, Dai). Resh Lakish taught that when God created the sea, it went on expanding, until God rebuked it and caused it to dry up, as Nahum 1:4 says, "He rebukes the sea and makes it dry, and dries up all the rivers."

A midrash taught that of four who made vows, two vowed and profited, and two vowed and lost. The Israelites vowed and profited in Numbers 21:2–3, and Hannah vowed and profited in 1 Samuel 1:11–20. Jephthah vowed and lost in Judges 11:30–40, and Jacob vowed in Genesis 28:20 and lost (some say in the loss of Rachel in Genesis 35:18 and some say in the disgrace of Dinah in Genesis 34:2, for Jacob's vow in Genesis 28:20 was superfluous, as Jacob had already received God's promise, and therefore Jacob lost because of it).

The Rabbis of the Talmud disputed whether Reuben sinned in Genesis 35:22. Rabbi Samuel bar Nahman said in Rabbi Jonathan's name that whoever maintains that Reuben sinned errs, for Genesis 35:22 says, "Now the sons of Jacob were twelve," teaching that they were all equal in righteousness. Rabbi Jonathan interpreted the beginning of Genesis 35:22, "and he lay with Bilhah his father's concubine," to teach that Reuben moved his father's bed from Bilhah's tent to Leah's tent, and Scripture imputes blame to him as though he had lain with her. Similarly, it was taught in a Baraita that Rabbi Simeon ben Eleazar said that the righteous Reuben was saved from sin. Rabbi Simeon ben Eleazar asked how Reuben's descendants could possibly have been directed to stand on Mount Ebal and proclaim in Deuteronomy 27:20, "Cursed be he who lies with his father's wife," if Reuben had sinned with Bilhah. Rabbi Simeon ben Eleazar interpreted Genesis 35:22, "and he lay with Bilhah his father's concubine," to teach that Reuben resented his mother Leah's humiliation and did not want Rachel's maid Bilhah to join Rachel as a rival to Leah. So Reuben moved her bed. Others told that Reuben moved two beds, one of the Divine Presence (Shechinah) and the other of his father, as Jacob set a couch for the Divine Presence in each of his wives' tents, and he spent the night where the Divine Presence came to rest. According to this view, one should read Genesis 49:4 to say, "Then you defiled my couch on which (the Divine Presence) went up." But the Gemara also reported disputes among the Tannaim on how to interpret the word "unstable (פַּחַז, pachaz)" in Genesis 49:4, where Jacob called Reuben, "unstable (פַּחַז, pachaz) as water." Several Rabbis read the word פַּחַז, pachaz, as an acronym, each letter indicating a word. Rabbi Eliezer interpreted Jacob to tell Reuben: "You were hasty (פ, paztah), you were guilty (ח, habtah), you disgraced (ז, zaltah)." Rabbi Joshua interpreted: "You overstepped (פ, pasatah) the law, you sinned (ח, hatata), you fornicated (ז, zanita)." Rabban Gamaliel interpreted: "You meditated (פ, pillaltah) to be saved from sin, you supplicated (ח, haltah), your prayer shone forth (ז, zarhah)." Rabban Gamaliel also cited the interpretation of Rabbi Eleazar the Modiite, who taught that one should reverse the word and interpret it: "You trembled (ז, zi'az'ata), you recoiled (ח, halita), your sin fled (פ, parhah) from you." Rava (or others say Rabbi Jeremiah bar Abba) interpreted: "You remembered (ז, zakarta) the penalty of the crime, you were grievously sick (ח, halita) through defying lust, you held aloof (פ, pirashta) from sinning."

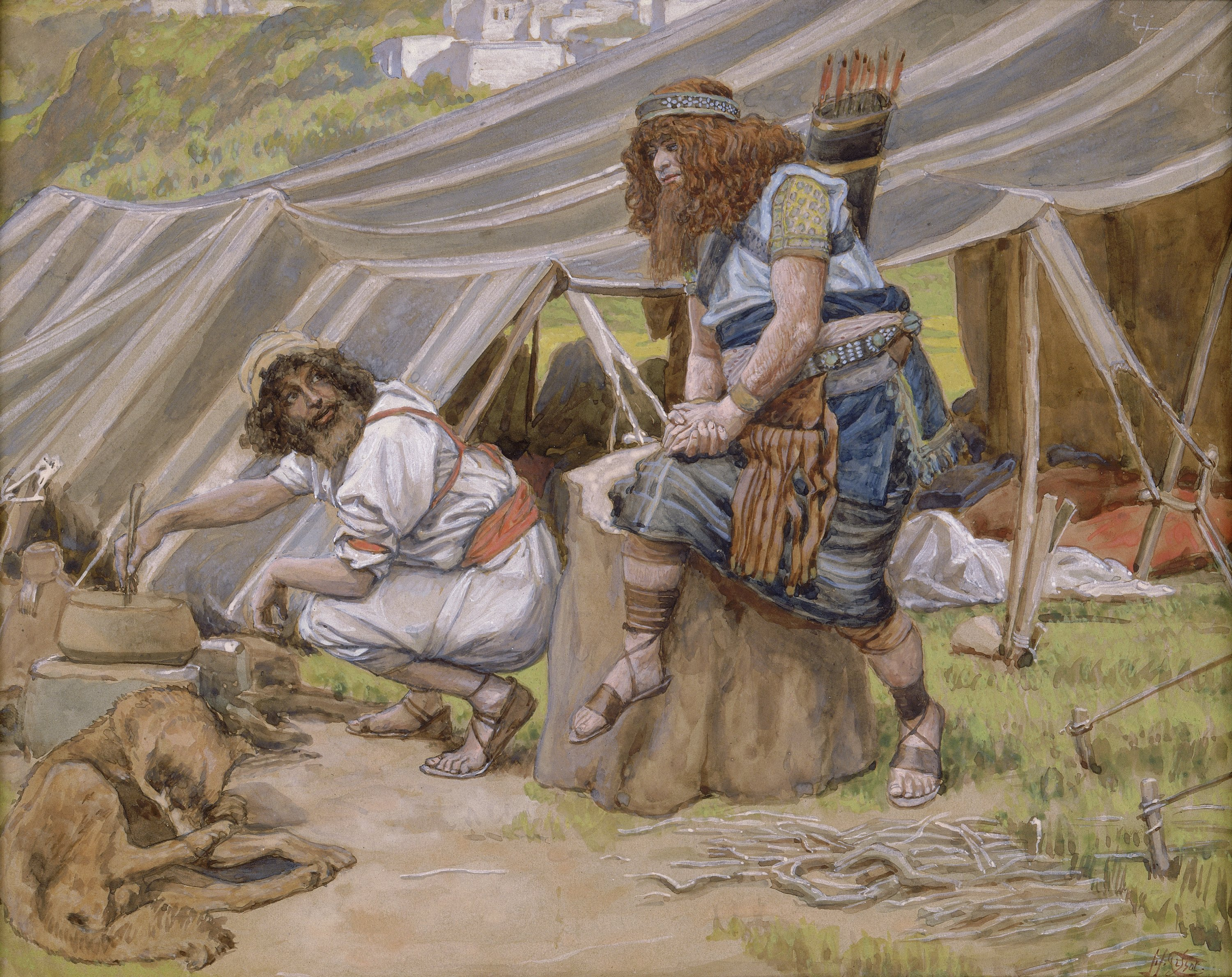
The Mess of Pottage (watercolor circa 1896–1902 by James Tissot)

Considering the consequences of Reuben's infidelity with Jacob's concubine Bilhah in Genesis 35:22, Rabbi Eleazar contrasted Reuben's magnanimity with Esau's jealousy. As Genesis 25:33 reports, Esau voluntarily sold his birthright, but as Genesis 27:41 says, "Esau hated Jacob," and as Genesis 27:36 says, "And he said, 'Is not he rightly named Jacob? for he has supplanted me these two times.'" In Reuben's case, Joseph took Reuben's birthright from him against his will, as 1 Chronicles 5:1 reports, "for as much as he defiled his father's couch, his birthright was given to the sons of Joseph." Nonetheless, Reuben was not jealous of Joseph, as Genesis 37:21 reports, "And Reuben heard it, and delivered him out of their hand."

A midrash taught that had Reuben not disgraced himself by his conduct with Bilhah in Genesis 35:22, his descendants would have been worthy of assuming the service of the Levites, for ordinary Levites came to replace firstborn Israelites, as Numbers 3:41 says, "And you shall take the Levites for Me, even the Lord, instead of all the firstborn among the children of Israel."

The Rabbis taught that Reuben reasoned that Joseph had included Reuben with his brethren in Joseph's dream of the sun and the moon and the eleven stars in Genesis 37:9, when Reuben thought that he had been expelled from the company of his brothers on account of the incident of Genesis 35:22. Because Joseph counted Reuben as a brother, Reuben felt motivated to rescue Joseph. And since Reuben was the first to engage in life saving, God decreed that the Cities of Refuge would be set up first within the borders of the Tribe of Reuben in Deuteronomy 4:43.

Rabbi Judah bar Simon taught that Moses later ameliorated the effects of Reuben's sin in Genesis 35:22. Rabbi Judah bar Simon read Deuteronomy 28:6, "Blessed shall you be when you come in, and blessed shall you be when you go out," to refer to Moses. Rabbi Judah bar Simon read "when you come in" to refer to Moses, because when he came into the world, he brought nearer to God Batya the daughter of Pharaoh (who by saving Moses from drowning merited life in the World to Come). And "blessed shall you be when you go out" also refers to Moses, for as he was departing the world, he brought Reuben nearer to his estranged father Jacob, when Moses blessed Reuben with the words "Let Reuben live and not die" in Deuteronomy 33:6 (thus gaining for Reuben the life in the World to Come and thus proximity to Jacob that Reuben forfeited when he sinned against his father in Genesis 35:22 and became estranged from him in Genesis 49:4).

The Mishnah taught that the story of Reuben's infidelity with Jacob's concubine Bilhah in Genesis 35:22 is read in the synagogue but not translated.

Rav and Samuel differed with regard to the Machpelah Cave in which the Patriarchs and Matriarchs were buried. One said that the cave consisted of two rooms, one farther in than the other. And the other said that it consisted of a room and a second story above it. The Gemara granted that the meaning of Machpelah—'double'—was understandable according to the one who said the cave consisted of one room above the other, but questioned how the cave was Machpelah—'double'—according to the one who said it consisted of two rooms, one farther in than the other, as even ordinary houses have two rooms. The Gemara answered that it was called "Machpelah" in the sense that it was doubled with the Patriarchs and Matriarchs, who were buried there in pairs. The Gemara compared this to the homiletic interpretation of the alternative name for Hebron mentioned in Genesis 35:27: “Mamre of Kiryat Ha’Arba, which is Hebron.” Rabbi Isaac taught that the city was called "Kiryat Ha’Arba"—'the city of four'—because it was the city of the four couples buried there: Adam and Eve, Abraham and Sarah, Isaac and Rebecca, and Jacob and Leah.

Expanding on Genesis 35:27, the Pirke De-Rabbi Eliezer told that Jacob took his sons, grandsons, and wives, and went to Kiryat Arba to be near Isaac. Jacob found Esau and his sons and wives there dwelling in Isaac's tents, so Jacob spread his tent apart from Esau's. Isaac rejoiced at seeing Jacob. Rabbi Levi said that in the hour when Isaac was dying, he left his cattle, possessions, and all that he had to his two sons, and therefore they both loved him, and thus Genesis 35:29 reports, "And Esau and Jacob his sons buried him." The Pirke De-Rabbi Eliezer told that after that, Esau told Jacob to divide Isaac's holdings into two portions, and Esau would choose first between the two portions as a right of being the older. Perceiving that Esau had his eye set on riches, Jacob divided the land of Israel and the Cave of Machpelah in one part and all the rest of Isaac's holdings in the other part. Esau went to consult with Ishmael, as reported in Genesis 28:9. Ishmael told Esau that the Amorite and the Canaanite were in the land, so Esau should take the balance of Isaac's holdings, and Jacob would have nothing. So Esau took Isaac's wealth and gave Jacob the land of Israel and the Cave of Machpelah, and they wrote a perpetual deed between them. Jacob then told Esau to leave the land, and Esau took his wives, children, and all that he had, as Genesis 36:6 reports, "And Esau took his wives . . . and all his possessions which he had gathered in the land of Canaan and went into a land away from his brother Jacob." As a reward, God gave Esau a hundred provinces from Seir to Magdiel, as Genesis 36:43 reports, and Magdiel is Rome. Then Jacob dwelt safely and in peace in the land of Israel.

The Midrash Tehillim interpreted Psalm 18:41, "You have given me the necks of my enemies," to allude to Judah, because Rabbi Joshua ben Levi reported an oral tradition that Judah slew Esau after the death of Isaac. Esau, Jacob, and all Jacob's children went to bury Isaac, as Genesis 35:29 reports, "Esau, Jacob, and his sons buried him," and they were all in the Cave of Machpelah sitting and weeping. At last Jacob's children stood up, paid their respects to Jacob, and left the cave so that Jacob would not be humbled by weeping exceedingly in their presence. But Esau reentered the cave, thinking that he would kill Jacob, as Genesis 27:41 reports, "And Esau said in his heart: 'Let the days of mourning for my father be at hand; then will I slay my brother Jacob.'" But Judah saw Esau go back and perceived at once that Esau meant to kill Jacob in the cave. Quickly Judah slipped after him and found Esau about to slay Jacob. So Judah killed Esau from behind. The neck of the enemy was given into Judah's hands alone, as Jacob blessed Judah in Genesis 49:8 saying, "Your hand shall be on the neck of your enemies." And thus David declared in Psalm 18:41, "You have given me the necks of my enemies," as if to say that this was David's patrimony, since Genesis 49:8 said it of his ancestor Judah.

=== Genesis chapter 36 ===
The Gemara taught that the use of the pronoun he (הוּא, hu) in an introduction, as in the words "this is (הוּא, hu) Esau" in Genesis 36:43, signifies that he was the same in his wickedness from the beginning to the end. Similar uses appear in Numbers 26:9 to teach Dathan and Abiram's enduring wickedness, in 2 Chronicles 28:22 to teach Ahaz's enduring wickedness, in Esther 1:1 to teach Ahasuerus's enduring wickedness, in 1 Chronicles 1:27 to teach Abraham's enduring righteousness, in Exodus 6:26 to teach Moses and Aaron's enduring righteousness, and in 1 Samuel 17:14 to teach David's enduring humility.

Notwithstanding Esau's conflicts with Jacob in Genesis 25–33, a Baraita taught that the descendants of Esau's descendant Haman studied Torah in Benai Berak.

== In medieval Jewish interpretation ==
The parashah is discussed in the medieval Jewish sources below.

=== Genesis chapter 32 ===
Notwithstanding Esau's conflicts with Jacob in Genesis 25–33, Rabbi Jacob ben Asher (Baal HaTurim), reading the Priestly Blessing of Numbers 6:24–26, noted that the numerical value (gematria) of the Hebrew word for peace (שָׁלוֹם, shalom) equals the numerical value of the word Esau (עֵשָׂו, Eisav). The Baal HaTurim concluded that this hints at the Mishnaic dictum that one should always reach out to be the first to greet any person, even an adversary.

Bahya ibn Paquda taught that whenever God singles out someone for special favor, that person is obliged to increase their service as an expression of gratitude. Baḥya reasoned that because of this, when good fortune came to the righteous of ancient times, they were troubled for two reasons: first, they worried about not falling short in fulfilling their duty of service and gratitude, and that this good fortune would not turn into misfortune, as Jacob said in Genesis 32:11, "I have diminished from all the mercies, and truth which You have shown to Your servant." Second, they were concerned that this reward from God was solely for their service and might come at the expense of their reward in the world to come, as the sages explained from their reading of Deuteronomy 7:10 ("And repays them that hate Him to their face (during this life) to destroy them (in the hereafter).")

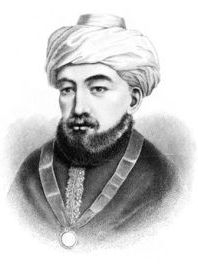
Maimonides

Maimonides taught that when scripture reports an angel's appearance or speech, it reports a vision or dream—regardless of whether the text expressly states so. This, Maimonides held, was the case when Genesis 32:25 reports regarding Jacob, "And a man wrestled with him." Maimonides concluded this took place in a prophetic vision, as Genesis 32:31 states that the "man" was an angel. Maimonides noted that the circumstances in Genesis 32 are exactly the same as those in the vision of Abraham in Genesis 18, where Scripture starts with the general statement of Genesis 18:1, "And the Lord appeared to him...," and follows with a detailed description. Similarly, Maimonides taught, the account of Jacob's vision begins in Genesis 32:2, "And the angels of God met him." Scripture then follows with a detailed description of how it came to pass that they met him. Maimonides argued that the "man" of Genesis 32:25 was one of the angels mentioned in Genesis 32:2, "And angels of God met him." Maimonides concluded that the wrestling and speaking occurred entirely in Jacob's prophetic vision.

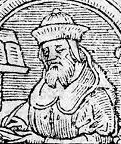
Rashi

Rashi read Jacob's words in Genesis 32:27, "unless you have blessed me," to ask the angel to concede to Jacob the blessings with which Isaac blessed Jacob, and to which Esau objected.

Rashi interpreted the angel's words in Genesis 32:29—"No longer… Jacob"—to mean that it would no longer be said that Isaac's blessings came to Jacob through trickery (עָקְבָה, akevah) and deceit, but with nobility and openness. Ultimately, God would reveal Godself to Jacob at Bethel, change Jacob's name, and there, God would bless Jacob; the angel would be present as well. The angel then acknowledged Isaac's blessings as Jacob's. Rashi explained that this is the meaning of Hosea 12:5, "He strove with an angel and prevailed over him; he wept and supplicated him," meaning that the angel wept and begged Jacob. Rashi taught that the angel supplicated Jacob by telling him, as Hosea 12:5 states: "In Bethel, he will find Him, and there He will speak with us." The angel asked Jacob to wait for him until God spoke with them there. However, Jacob did not agree to release the angel, and, against the angel's will, the angel acknowledged the blessings as Jacob's. Rashi read Genesis 32:30, "And he blessed him there," to mean that the angel asked Jacob to wait, but Jacob chose not to so.

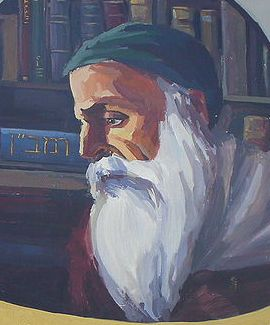
Nachmanides

Reading Genesis 32:30, "And he said: 'Why is it that you ask after my name?'" Nachmanides wrote that the angel told Jacob that there was no benefit for Jacob in knowing the angel's name, because no one else had the power or capability except God alone.

Isaac ben Moses Arama read the angel's request in Genesis 32:30 for Jacob to let him go as simply another way of asking Jacob why he was wasting his time detaining the angel, when he should have been busy preparing gifts for Esau. Isaac ben Moses Arama taught that Jacob's request to know the angel's name meant that Jacob wanted to know who had the power to inflict such damage on his hip joint. The angel told Jacob that it was not the angel's name that mattered, since the ability to inflict damage was not rooted in the angel's identity, but rather, the angel's mission was the important thing.

=== Genesis chapter 33 ===
Reading the identification of God in Genesis 33:20 as "the God of Israel," Baḥya ibn Paquda explained that the text used this description because people cannot understand anything about God except for God's Name and that God exists. Thus, scripture identifies God through the way that Jews gained knowledge of God—the traditions of their ancestors from whom they inherited it, as Genesis 18:19 states, "For I (God) have known him (Abraham), to the end that he may command his children and his household after him, that they may keep the way of the Lord, to do righteousness and justice." Baḥya suggested that it might also be possible that scripture so identifies God because those ancestors in their generations served God when all around them worshipped other "gods" (like idols, the sun, the moon, or money).

=== Genesis chapter 35 ===
Rashi explained Genesis 35:10, "Your name shall no longer be called Jacob (יַעֲקֹב)," to intimate a change from an expression of a man who comes with stealth and guile (עָקְבָה, akvah) to Israel (יִשְׂרָאֵל), a term denoting a prince (שַׂר, sar) and a chief.

Maimonides wrote that the encounter recorded in Genesis 35:10—God said to him: 'Your name is Jacob'"—is an instance of a prophet reporting the words of an angel without mentioning that they were perceived in a dream or vision, assuming that it is well known that prophecy can only originate in one of those two ways.

== In modern interpretation ==
The parashah is discussed in these modern sources:

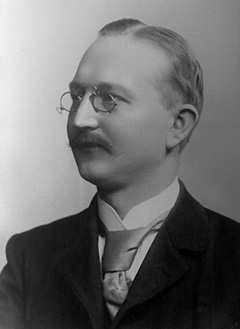
Gunkel

=== Genesis chapters 25–33 ===
Hermann Gunkel wrote that the legend cycle of Jacob-Esau-Laban divided clearly into the legends (1) of Jacob and Esau (Genesis 25:19–34; 27:1–45; 27:46–28:9; 32:3–21; 33:1–17), (2) of Jacob and Laban (Genesis 29:1–30; 30:25–31:55), (3) of the origin of the twelve tribes (Genesis 29:31–30:24), and (4) of the origin of ritual observances (Genesis 28:10–22; 32:1–2, 22–32).

Walter Brueggemann suggested a chiastic structure to the Jacob narrative (shown in the chart below), moving from conflict with Esau to reconciliation with Esau. Within that is conflict with Laban moving to covenant with Laban. And within that, at the center, is the narrative of births, in which the birth of Joseph (at Genesis 30:24) marks the turning point in the entire narrative, after which Jacob looks toward the Land of Israel and his brother Esau. Amid the conflicts are the two major encounters with God, which occur at crucial times in the sequence of conflicts.

The Jacob Narrative
Conflict with Esau						Reconciliation with Esau
25:19–34; 27:1–45; 27:46–28:9						32–33:17
	Meeting at Bethel				Meeting at Penu'el	
	28:10–22				32:22–32	
		Conflict with Laban		Covenant with Laban		
		29:1–30		30:25–31:55		
			Births			
			29:31–30:24			

Acknowledging that some interpreters view Jacob's two encounters with God in Genesis 28:10–22 and 32–33:17 as parallel, Terence Fretheim argued that one may see more significant levels of correspondence between the two Bethel stories in Genesis 28:10–22 and 35:1–15, and one may view the oracle to Rebekah in Genesis 25:23 regarding "struggling" as parallel to Jacob's struggle at the Jabbok in Genesis 32–33:17. Fretheim concluded that these four instances of Divine speaking link to each other in complex ways.

Nahum Sarna reported that modern scholars deduce from the Genesis listings of Jacob's sons the evolution of the league of Israelite tribes. These scholars deduce from the listing of Reuben, Simeon, Levi, and Judah as Leah tribes that they were politically related. As their tribal territories were not contiguous, their organizing principle could not have been geographical, and their association must therefore reflect a presettlement reality. These scholars conclude that the six Leah tribes must have originated as a separate fraternity in Mesopotamia that evolved in two distinct stages. The account of the birth of Jacob's sons in Genesis 29:31–35:18 preserves the earliest traditions. The position of Judah as the fourth son reflects the situation prior to Judah's ascendancy, reflected in Genesis 49:8–12. The handmaid tribes had a subordinate status. And the tribe of Benjamin was the last to join the Israelite league and came into being in Canaan.

=== Genesis chapter 32 ===
John Kselman noted that Jacob's prayer in Genesis 32:10–13 contained the essential features of (1) the address to God in Genesis 32:10, (2) the petition in Genesis 32:12, and (3) the motivation for God to grant the petition in Genesis 32:13.

Kselman noted that Jacob's dividing his gifts to Esau into droves in Genesis 32:14–22 served both to appease Esau and to act as a buffer between Esau and Jacob.

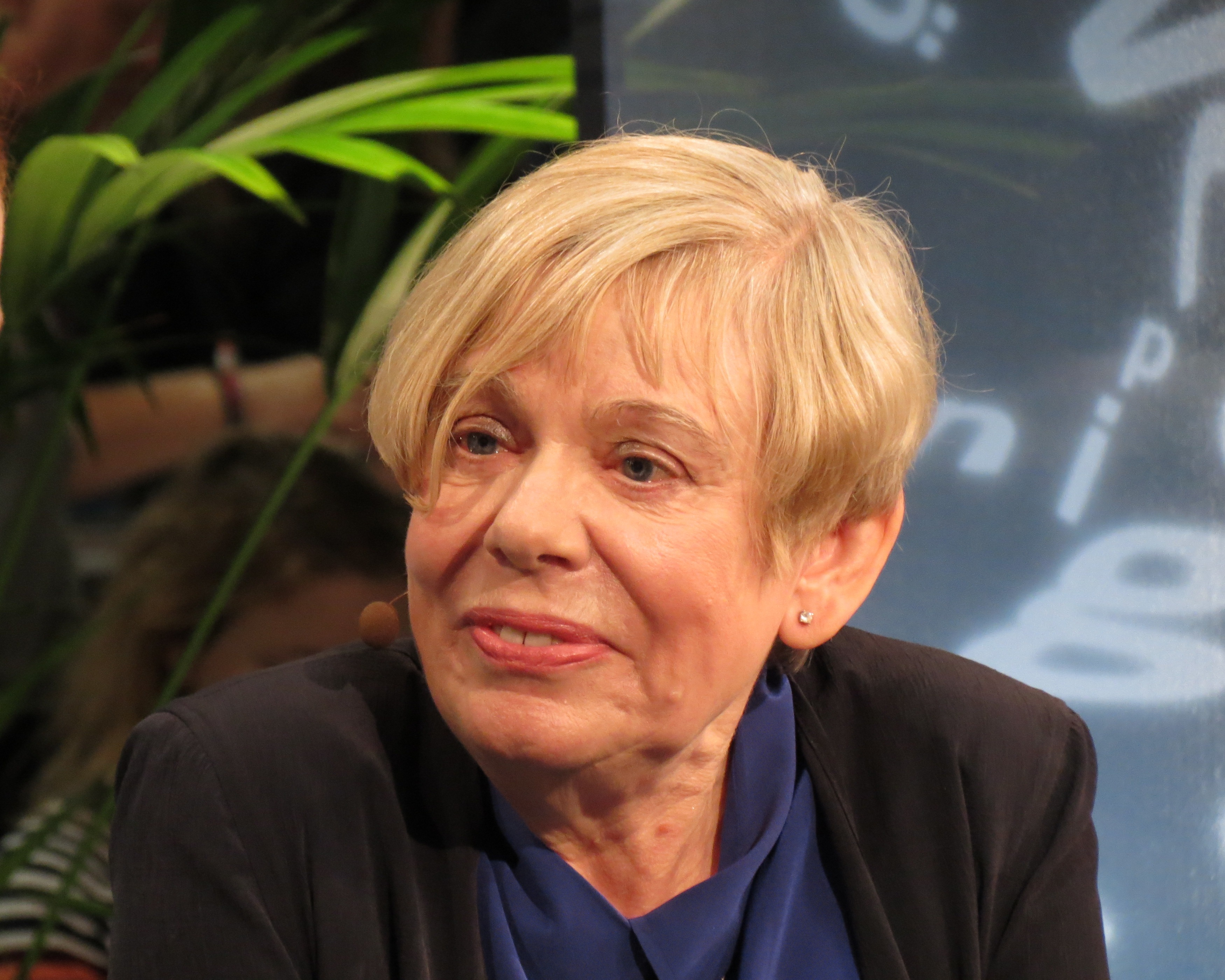
Armstrong

Everett Fox translated Genesis 32:21: "For [Jacob] said to himself: I will wipe [the anger from] his face with the gift that goes ahead of my face; afterward, when I see his face, perhaps he will lift up my face!" Karen Armstrong wrote that Fox's translation preserved the "insistent diction" of the Hebrew, directing the reader to Jacob's imminent wrestling match, when Jacob would see God "face to face" (in the words of Genesis 32:31), and implying that the "faces" of God, Jacob, and Esau were all the same. Armstrong argued that by facing his brother, Jacob confronted the "face" of God but also confronted himself. Jacob came to terms not only with his wronged brother, but with Jacob's inner Esau, the alter ego that Jacob hated and had tried to discard. Armstrong concluded that only by confronting the subconscious aspects of his personality that filled his waking self with fear and disgust could Jacob heal his internal conflict and experience God's healing power.

Kselman cited the identification of the adversary as Divine as the chief difficulty with the story of Jacob wrestling with a mysterious adversary in Genesis 32:25–33. Kselman suggested that at an earlier level of the story, the opponent may have been some Canaanite god attempting to keep Jacob from entering the land. But Israel's monotheism did away with the possibility of supernatural adversaries to God. So the resulting text enigmatically has God both originate the quest of returning to Canaan in Genesis 31:3 and 13 and oppose the quest in Genesis 32:25–33.

Everett Fox argued that the wrestling scene in Genesis 32:25–33 both symbolized and resolved beforehand Jacob's meeting with Esau in Genesis 33, much as William Shakespeare's prebattle dream scenes did in his plays Julius Caesar, Richard III, and Macbeth. The struggle motif, introduced in Genesis 25, returned in Genesis 32, but Fox argued that Jacob's whole life and personality were at stake, as despite his recent material successes, they were still under the pall of Esau's curse in Genesis 27:36. Fox concluded that the name change in Genesis 32:29 was central, suggesting both victory in the struggle and the emergence of a new power.

Ephraim Speiser read the eerie encounter at Penuel in Genesis 32:25–33 to teach that no one may grasp God's complete design, which remains reasonable and just no matter who the chosen agent may be at any given point.

=== Genesis chapter 33 ===
Rabbi Tamar Elad-Appelbaum reads the words of Genesis 33:14, "As for me, I will travel slowly", to teach that the proper way to live consists of self-restraint and deliberation.

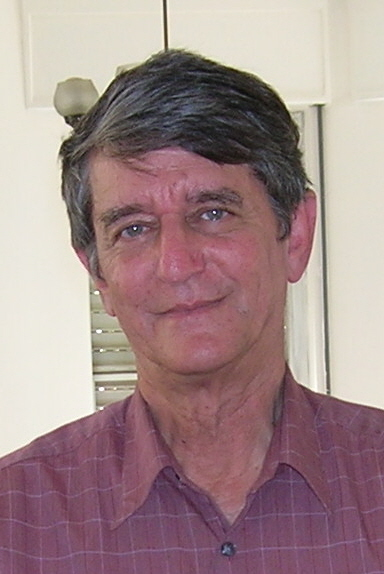
Kugel

=== Genesis chapter 34 ===
Noting the similarity between the actions of Simeon and Levi in Genesis 34:25–29, on the one hand, and the instructions in Deuteronomy 20:13–14 for killing the men but taking the women and livestock captive, on the other hand, James Kugel observed that it is almost as if Simeon and Levi were obeying the Deuteronomic law before it was given. Kugel reported that some modern interpreters deduced that the editor responsible for inserting the Dinah story in Genesis was particularly connected with Deuteronomy or at least familiar with its laws. These interpreters concluded that the Dinah story was a late addition, inserted to account for Jacob's otherwise referentless allusion to the violent tempers of Simeon and Levi in Genesis 49:5–7 by importing and only slightly modified an originally unrelated tale, probably situated during the time of the Judges.

=== Genesis chapter 36 ===
Gunkel noted that Genesis 36:31–39 enumerates the kings of Edom down to the time of David, and cited this as evidence of a great interval of time between the period of the patriarchs and that of the narrators of Genesis.

== Commandments ==
According to Maimonides and Sefer ha-Chinuch, there is one negative commandment in the parashah:

- Not to eat the sinew of the thigh (gid ha-nasheh).

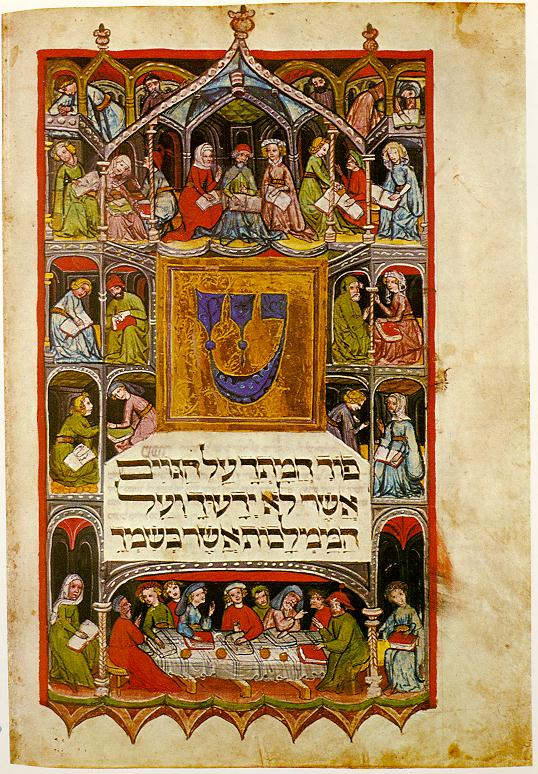
A page from a 14th-century German Haggadah

== In the liturgy ==
The traditional Passover Haggadah, in the concluding nirtzah section of the Seder, in a reference to Genesis 32:23–30, recounts how Israel struggled with an angel and overcame him at night.

In the blessing recited after meals (Birkat Hamazon), at the close of the fourth blessing (of thanks for God's goodness), Jews allude to God's blessing of the Patriarchs described in Genesis 24:1, 27:33, and 33:11.

In the morning blessings (Birkot hashachar), before the first recitation of Shema Yisrael, Jews refer to God's changing of Jacob's name to Israel in Genesis 35:10.

== Haftarah ==
A haftarah is a text selected from the books of Nevi'im ("The Prophets") that is read publicly in the synagogue after the reading of the Torah on Sabbath and holiday mornings. The haftarah usually has a thematic link to the Torah reading that precedes it.

The specific text read following Parashat Vayishlach varies according to different traditions within Judaism. Examples are:

- for Ashkenazi Jews: Hosea 11:7–12:12 or Obadiah 1:1–21
- for Sephardi Jews: Obadiah 1:1–21

=== Connection to the parshah ===
The section from the Book of Hosea mentions the deeds of Jacob, including his wrestling with an angel.

The Book of Obadiah deals with God's wrath against the kingdom of Edom, who are descended from Esau. At times Esau's name is used as a synonym for the nation.

== Bibliography ==
- Armstrong, Karen (1996). In the Beginning: A New Interpretation of Genesis. New York: Knopf.
- Brueggemann, Walter (1982). Genesis. Interpretation: A Bible Commentary for Teaching and Preaching. Atlanta: John Knox Press.
- Davis, Menachem, ed. (2006). Schottenstein Edition Interlinear Chumash: Bereishis/Genesis. Brooklyn: Mesorah Publications.
- Sarna, Nahum M. (1989). The JPS Torah Commentary: Genesis. Philadelphia: Jewish Publication Society.
