= Pelech (school) =

Secondary school in Jerusalem

Coordinates: 31°45′26.8″N 35°13′2.06″E

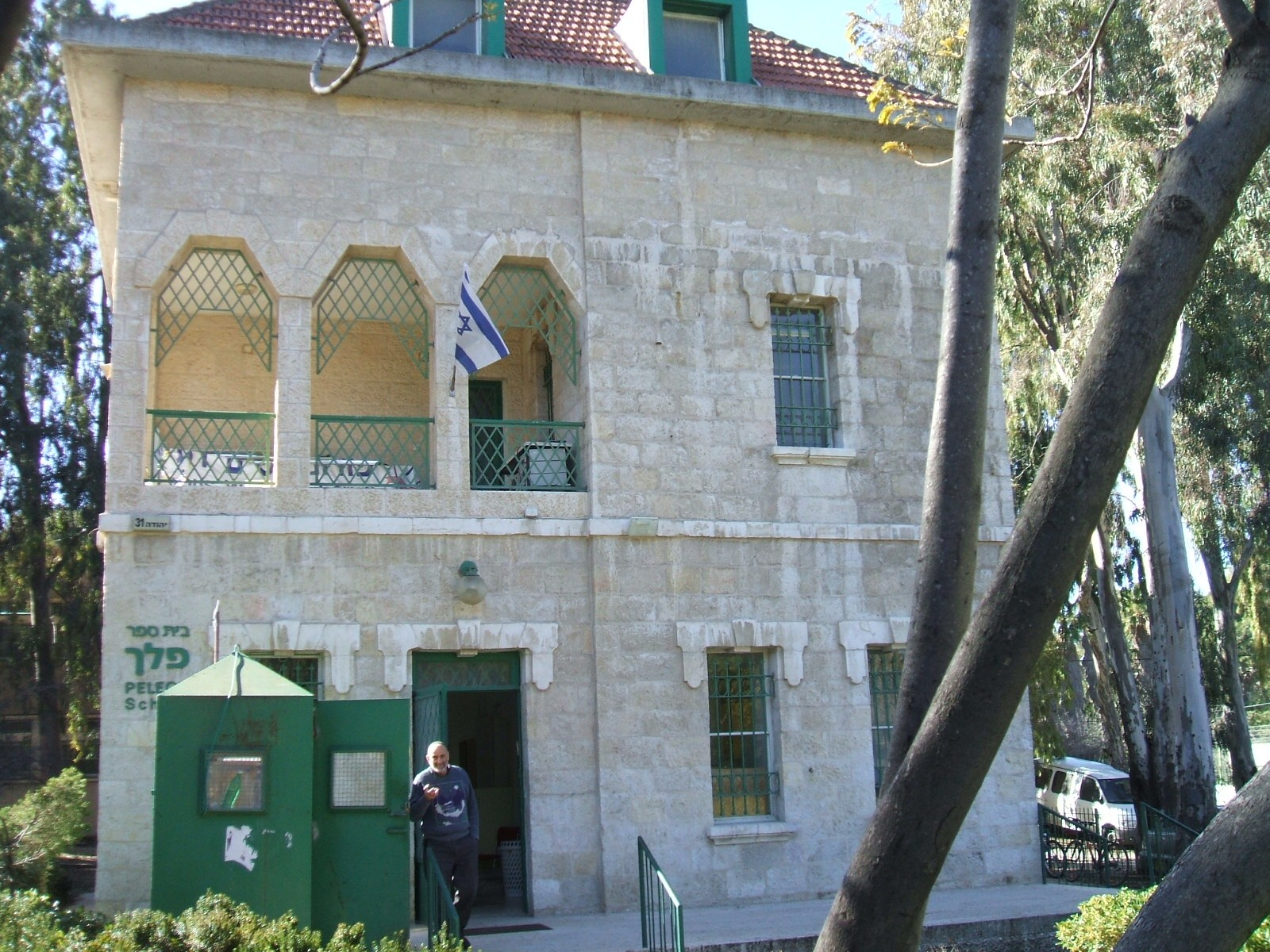
Beit Sefer Pelech

Pelech (Hebrew: פלך, lit. spindle) is a high school for religious girls located in the Baka neighborhood in Jerusalem. Alice Shalvi, a British-raised professor of English literature at Hebrew University of Jerusalem, is credited with turning the school into one of Jerusalem's most prestigious high schools.

== History ==
Pelech was founded by Rabbi Shalom Rosenblüth and his wife Penina as an alternative to the Beis Yaakov girls' educational system, but was banned by the Haredi establishment soon after its establishment. It first opened in the clubhouse of the Bnei Akiva youth movement in Pardes Hannah in 1963. When Rosenblüth and his wife relocated to Jerusalem, the school moved with them to Bayit Vegan. From the outset, the school curriculum included Talmud as a compulsory subject, a revolutionary step in the Israeli religious educational system, where girls did not study Talmud.

After the Six-Day War, the school was given an abandoned building on Mount Zion. The student population totaled 50 girls. Rosenblüth taught Talmud, mathematics and physics, and his wife taught English. Other teachers were Rabbi Yehuda Amital, Rabbi Mordechai Breuer, Professor André Neher and Dr. Hananel Mack.

The school, facing financial and other difficulties, was on the brink of closure in 1975, when Alice Shalvi, who had come to appreciate the school's philosophy, volunteered her services for a limited period. She served as principal for the next 15 years, until 1990.

After Shalvi‘s departure, Shira Breuer, continued leading the school for the next 25 years.

In 2008, Pelech topped a Ministry of Education list of schools with the highest number of students graduating with honors. Classes include divinity studies and enhanced general studies. Majoring in both physics and Talmud is not unusual.

In 2011 Pelech opened a Junior High School and added grades 7 and 8, and Rachel Tzur was appointed as the head of the middle-school classes.

== See also ==
- Education in Israel
- Ulpana
- Women in Israel
- Women in Judaism
